= WHLS =

Coordinates: 42°58′37″N 82°27′52″W

- Port Huron, Michigan; United States
- Frequency: 1380 kHz
- Branding: News, Talk, and Sports 1380 WPHM (from former call sign)

Programming
- Format: News/talk
- Affiliations: Michigan IMG Sports Network; Detroit Lions Radio Network

Ownership
- Owner: Radio First

History
- First air date: August 8, 1938
- Last air date: April 6, 2026
- Former call signs: WPHM (1938-2026)
- Former frequencies: 1370 kHz (1938-1941)
- Call sign meaning: Herman Leroy Stevens

Technical information
- Licensing authority: FCC
- Facility ID: 25988
- Class: B
- Power: 5,000 watts unlimited

Links
- Public license information: Public file; LMS

WHLS (1380 kHz) was a commercial AM radio station in Port Huron, Michigan. The station broadcast an alternative rock format branded as Port Huron's Alternative - Rock 105.5, airing on 1450 AM and 105.5 FM. On April 6, 2026, owner Radio First swapped call signs and frequencies with sister station WPHM. The license was subsequently cancelled on April 13, 2026.

== Programming ==
The station broadcast an alternative format branded as Port Huron's Alternative - Rock 105.5. Between 2000 and 2019, WHLS simulcast its programming on sister station WHLX in Marine City, Michigan.

Until July 2020, WHLS competed with CHKS-FM 106.3 MHz in Sarnia, Ontario. The station flipped to Classic Hits, leaving WHLS as the standalone active rock station in the market.

On April 6, 2026, WHLS swapped call signs with sister station WPHM. AM 1450 and its translator on 105.5 FM became the new home of WPHM, with plans to cease broadcasting on AM 1380, the WHLS calls being assigned to the silenced station. The new format on WPHM is primarily derived from its sister station WHLX 1590/ 92.7 "The Hills", which also signed off permanently on April 6.

== History ==
WHLS signed on in August 1938 at 1370 kHz with 250 watts of power. It was for a time the principal Top 40 music station in the Port Huron and Sarnia area, as well as the very first radio station serving St. Clair County. The station was found by the late H.L. Stevens. Its first broadcast was the opening of the Blue Water Bridge. In 1941, WHLS moved to its present-day dial position of 1450 kHz. The first manager was Angus Pfaff and the first program director was Fred A. Knorr, a former part owner of the Detroit Tigers. Knorr would go on to own stations in Jackson, Saginaw, and Detroit. John F. Wismer started working for WHLS in the Fall of 1947 doing play by play sports announcing and advertising sales. Wismer was promoted to station manager in 1950 and became part owner in 1952. The company then became known as Stevens Wismer Broadcasting Co. Numerous acquisitions were made by the company over the years. In 1953, WLEW in Bad Axe was purchased, followed by WCSR in Hillsdale in 1955 and then was sold in 1957 when Grand Rapids station WLAV was purchased.

Legendary NHL hockey broadcaster Mike Emrick got his first big break at WHLS calling games for the Port Huron Flags minor hockey team with sales manager Larry Smith in the mid-1970s. Emrick would go on to broadcast Olympic hockey games and Stanley Cup playoffs for NBC Sports, and is a frequent guest contributor to sister station WPHM.

In 1983, Wismer Broadcasting started the cable television system in Port Huron which was known as Port Huron T.V. Cable Company. That year was also when sister station WSAQ was launched. John Wismer died in 1999.

WHLS logo as "America's Best Music"

The station was sold to Liggett Communications (also known as Radio First) in 2000 by Wismer's estate. Liggett had also acquired Wismer's crosstown competitor, WPHM and WBTI that same year from Hanson Communications.

In 2000, WHLS's satellite Oldies was simulcast over WHLX for the first time. Its format then changed to Adult Standards America's Best Music format in 2001, and back to Oldies using Dial Global's Kool Gold Timeless Classics format in 2009. The return to oldies came after CHOK in Sarnia flipped to a country format.

=== "The Cruise" ===
WHLS logo as "The Cruise"

In July 2011, WHLS/WHLX dropped the Dial Global Kool Gold format and transitioned to airing a locally automated classic hits/adult hits format. The local format is branded as "WHLS - The Cruise" and is staffed by Radio First personalities. WHLS/WHLX's new format is a more traditional Classic Hits mix of the late 1960s, and into the 1980s with some classic rock and roll influences, as well as a few tracks from the 1990s and 2000s up to AC recurrents from artists such as Maroon 5 and Katy Perry. The station also aired locally oriented talk shows on Saturday mornings and church services on Sunday Mornings. The station aired the syndicated program American Standards By The Sea Saturday mornings.

The Cruise format ended on April 20, 2015, at 10:55 am, with the last song being Don McLean's American Pie.

=== New Format "Rock 105.5" ===
WHLS logo as "Rock 105.5"

WHLS changed their format to active rock on April 20, 2015, with the first song being Smells Like Teen Spirit by Nirvana. The new station is branded as "Rock 105.5", the frequency of the new FM translator WHLS acquired from a religious broadcaster the previous year. The station continues to broadcast on AM 1450 and AM 1590 but with little to no reference of the station's AM counterparts. Following the format change, Rock 105.5 dropped WHLS's traditional "Hometown Christmas" in favor of its new music format. Rock 105.5 staff claimed they did not want to "bombard listeners with Christmas music", and limited Christmas songs to once per hour.

WHLS is also the radio home of the University of Michigan football and is a member of the Michigan IMG Sports Network, an affiliation the station has had for decades, transcending music formats. The Port Huron Fighting Falcons were on "The Cruise" for their entire 4-year history. The Detroit Pistons, who were also on "The Cruise", were moved to WPHM following the format change. However, WHLS still airs conflicting sports games that would usually air on WPHM such as the Detroit Lions.

=== Signal consolidation ===
On March 2, 2026, Radio First announced that it would be consolidating its AM radio signals into one signal, and shutting down WPHM 1380 and WHLX 1590. The WPHM call sign is slated to be recycled on WHLS 1450, the current formats of WHLS and WPHM would be eliminated aside from Detroit Tigers and Lions play-by-play game coverage, and the format of WHLX would be heard on 1450/105.5 along with some Sunday morning church programming. WPHM 1380 and WHLX 1590 are to be shut down April 6, and the licenses turned in afterward.

== Technical ==
WHLS covers most of St. Clair County, Michigan as well as southern Sanilac County, Michigan with 1,000 watts of power day and night. The transmitter is located on 32nd Street in Port Huron Township, using the same site and same tower as sister station WSAQ.

=== FM Translator ===
W288BT is a low-powered translator at 105.5 FM licensed to St. Clair, Michigan. W288BT was originally owned by Radio Assist Ministry, and then owned by Edgewater Broadcasting, which previously used the station to broadcast a Christian music format. Edgewater then leased the translator to Liggett Communications as a simulcast of WHLS.

The FM translator originally started broadcasting on and off beginning in the summer of 2014 from the Radio First studios in Downtown Port Huron with 250 watts. After the switch from "The Cruise" (which never branded itself as being on FM) to "Rock 105.5" (which only brands itself as being on FM), a construction permit was granted to WHLS to move the translator to their parent station's tower on 32nd Street in Port Huron Township. The station currently broadcasts with only 49 watts but from a much higher tower and covers the immediate Port Huron, Fort Gratiot, and Marysville areas.

After the move to the WHLS tower, 105.5 FM began broadcasting information that would be received on Radio Data System (RDS) radios.

One reasoning of Liggett Communications getting the 105.5 FM translator, is due to both WHLS and WHLX having limited nighttime range.

Liggett Communications purchased W288BT's license from Edgewater Broadcasting effective June 7, 2018.
