= Detroit Lions Radio Network =

American radio network

The Detroit Lions Radio Network is a radio network in Michigan and Toledo, Ohio that broadcasts all of the NFL's Detroit Lions games and related programming. All preseason, regular season, and postseason games are aired live throughout the network. The announcers are WJBK (Fox 2) sports director Dan Miller with play-by-play, former Lions offensive tackle Lomas Brown with color commentary, and former Lions guard T. J. Lang serving as sideline reporter. Network coverage begins two hours before game time and ends one hour after the game's conclusion. Games are also aired on Sirius XM Radio and online with a subscription to NFL Game Pass or TuneIn Premium. The Lions' flagship station returned to WXYT-FM starting with the 2021 season, after a five-year stint at WJR. As of the 2024 season, the network consists of 50 stations in 40 markets in Michigan and one in Ohio.

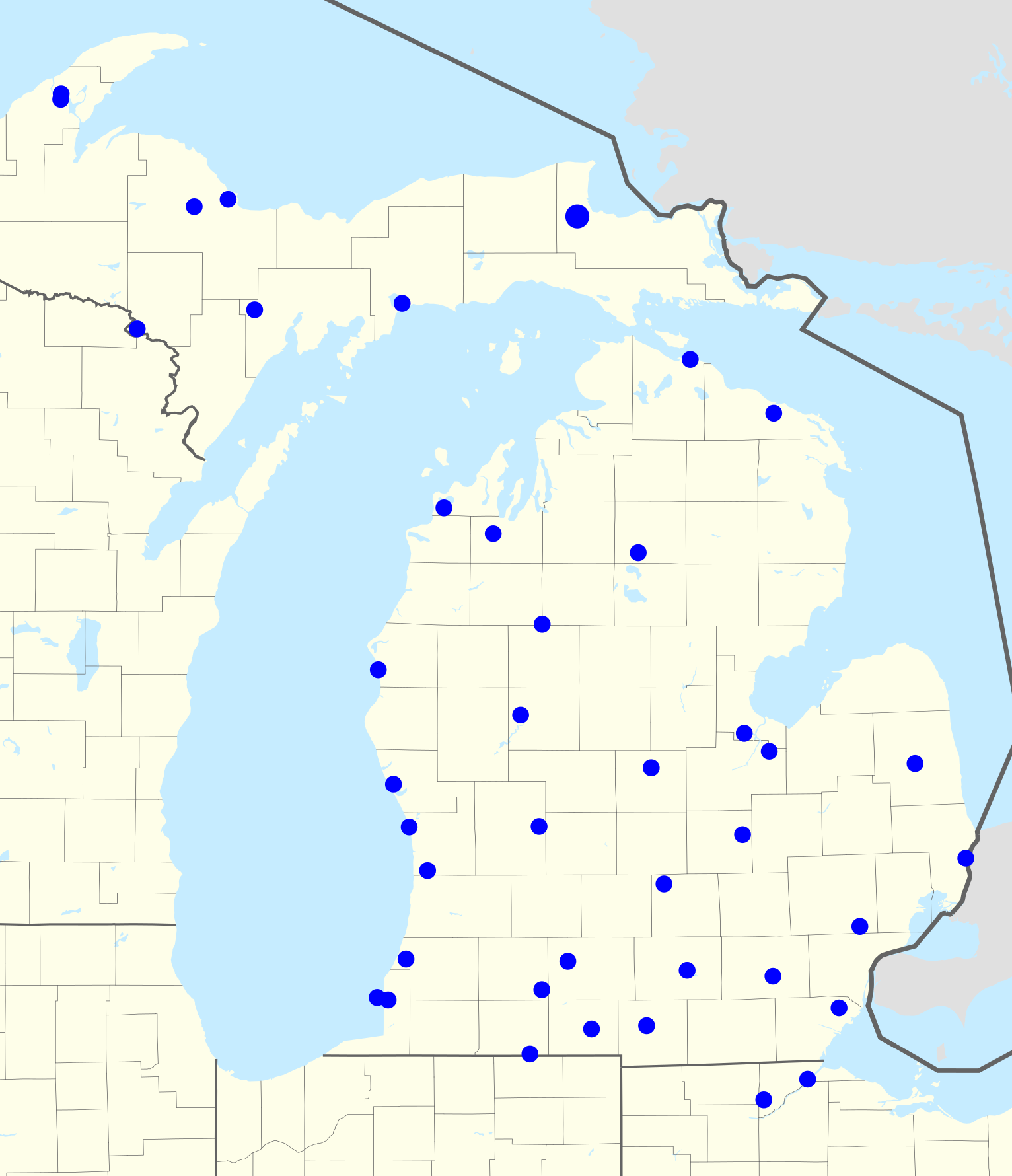
Map of radio affiliates.

== Station list ==
Callsign	Frequency	Band	City	State	Network status
WXYT-FM	97.1	FM	Detroit	Michigan	Flagship
WLEN-HD2*	103.9-2	FM	Adrian	Michigan	Affiliate
W243AD	96.5	FM	Adrian	Michigan	WLEN-HD2 relay
WFYC	1280	AM	Alma	Michigan	Affiliate
WRGZ	96.7	FM	Alpena–Rogers City	Michigan	Affiliate
WTKA	1050	AM	Ann Arbor	Michigan	Affiliate
WFAT	930	AM	Battle Creek	Michigan	Affiliate
W274AQ	102.7	FM	Battle Creek	Michigan	WFAT relay
WBRN	1460	AM	Big Rapids	Michigan	Affiliate
W243EN	96.5	FM	Big Rapids	Michigan	WBRN relay
WKAD	93.7	FM	Cadillac–Harrietta	Michigan	Affiliate
WIDL	92.1	FM	Cass City	Michigan	Affiliate
WWCS	95.3	FM	Cheboygan	Michigan	Affiliate
WYKX	104.7	FM	Escanaba	Michigan	Affiliate
WRSR	103.9	FM	Flint	Michigan	Affiliate
WGFN	98.1	FM	Glen Arbor–Manistee	Michigan	Affiliate
WGHN	1370	AM	Grand Haven	Michigan	Affiliate
W235CM	94.9	FM	Grand Haven	Michigan	WGHN relay
WLAV-FM	96.9	FM	Grand Rapids	Michigan	Affiliate
WJRW	1340	AM	Grand Rapids	Michigan	Affiliate
W291DJ	106.1	FM	Grand Rapids	Michigan	WJRW relay
WQON	100.3	FM	Grayling	Michigan	Affiliate
WGLI	98.7	FM	Hancock	Michigan	Affiliate
WCSR-FM	92.1	FM	Hillsdale	Michigan	Affiliate
WHTC	1450	AM	Holland	Michigan	Affiliate
W259CO	99.7	FM	Holland	Michigan	WHTC relay
WCCY	1400	AM	Houghton	Michigan	Affiliate
W257CZ	99.3	FM	Houghton	Michigan	WCCY relay
WIMK	93.1	FM	Iron Mountain	Michigan	Affiliate
WJMS	590	AM	Ironwood	Michigan	Affiliate
W221EH	92.1	FM	Ironwood	Michigan	WJMS relay
WKHM-HD2*	105.3-2	FM	Jackson	Michigan	Affiliate
W270CJ	101.9	FM	Jackson	Michigan	WKHM-HD2 relay
WKZO	590	AM	Kalamazoo	Michigan	Affiliate
W295CL	106.9	FM	Kalamazoo	Michigan	WKZO relay
WJIM	1240	AM	Lansing	Michigan	Affiliate
W295BP	106.9	FM	Lansing	Michigan	WJIM relay
WCMM	102.5	FM	Manistique–Gulliver	Michigan	Affiliate
WUPT	100.3	FM	Marquette–Ishpeming	Michigan	Affiliate
WLCS	98.3	FM	Muskegon	Michigan	Affiliate
WNBY-FM	93.9	FM	Newberry–Sault Ste. Marie	Michigan	Affiliate
WUPY	101.1	FM	Ontonagon	Michigan	Affiliate
WWTH	100.7	FM	Oscoda	Michigan	Affiliate
WMBN	1340	AM	Petoskey	Michigan	Affiliate
W284DF	104.7	FM	Petoskey	Michigan	WMBN relay
WPHM	1380	AM	Port Huron	Michigan	Affiliate
WHLS	1450	AM	Port Huron	Michigan	Conflicting games
W288BT	105.5	FM	Port Huron	Michigan	WHLS relay
WKQZ	93.3	FM	Saginaw–Midland–Bay City	Michigan	Affiliate
WTGV-FM	97.7	FM	Sandusky	Michigan	Affiliate
WCSY-FM	103.7	FM	South Haven	Michigan	Affiliate
WSJM-FM	94.9	FM	St. Joseph–Benton Harbor	Michigan	Affiliate
WBET-FM	99.3	FM	Sturgis	Michigan	Affiliate
WQQO-HD2*	105.5-2	FM	Sylvania	Ohio	Affiliate
W264AK	100.7	FM	Toledo	Ohio	WQQO-HD2 relay
WLDR-FM	101.9	FM	Traverse City	Michigan	Affiliate
WLAW	1490	AM	Whitehall	Michigan	Affiliate
W256DM	99.1	FM	Whitehall	Michigan	WLAW relay

- Blue background indicates low-power FM translator.
- Gray background indicates station is a simulcast of another station.

== History ==
- Dan Miller has been the radio play-by-play voice of the Lions since 2005. Miller succeeded Mark Champion, who had called play-by-play for the team from 1989-2004.
- Van Patrick called play-by-play from 1950 until his death in 1974.
- Other past announcers for Lions radio include Frank Beckmann, Bob Reynolds, Dave Diles and Ray Lane.
- Jim Brandstatter was the Lions' radio color commentator from 1987–2017.
- Tony Ortiz provided Lions sideline reports from 2001 until 2016. He produced Lions games broadcasts from 1991-1994.
- WXYT (AM) was the sole flagship station of the network from 1998-2004.
- In 2005, the Lions' flagship became an FM station for the first time in their history, when a long term agreement was signed with WKRK (now WXYT-FM).
- Detroit's WWJ was the team's flagship station prior to 1998, and continued to simulcast WXYT's broadcasts prior to the team's move to WKRK. Prior to 1989, WJR had served as the Lions' radio flagship.
- Former names of the network include "The WXYT 1270 Detroit Lions Radio Network", "The WKRK Detroit Lions Radio Network", and "The Live 97.1 Detroit Lions Radio Network" (WKRK-FM is WXYT-FM's former callsign, and Live 97.1 is one of its former brandings).
- WXYT-FM was the Lions' flagship from 2004–2015.
- On November 20, 2015, it was announced that the Detroit Lions would move to WJR beginning in the 2016 NFL season, ending the team's 20-year relationship with CBS Radio. Officials stated that CBS had dropped the team over demands that it censor on-air content that was critical of the team. In particular, the Lions specifically demanded that flagship station WXYT-FM fire popular on-air personality Mike Valenti as a condition of any extension to its broadcast rights since Valenti has had a history of making remarks critical of the Lions and their poor performance. WXYT-FM refused to do so, and he remains at the station.

== See also ==
- List of XM Satellite Radio channels
- List of Sirius Satellite Radio stations
- NFL on Westwood One
- Detroit Lions Television Network
