= Tony Ortiz =

Sports radio presenter

- Born: Anthony Ortiz; Detroit, Michigan
- Other name: T.O.
- Education: Specs Howard School of Media Arts, Diploma
- Occupations: Radio: sports talk show host and reporter, NFL sideline reporter, MLB reporter TV: sports analyst
- Notable credit(s): Radio: Detroit Lions Radio Network (2001–2016); WXYT-AM, WXYT-FM and WWJ; TV: Fox 2 Sports Works (WJBK)
- Website: http://www.wwj.com/pages/118694.php?contentType=4&contentId=233934

Tony Ortiz is a sportscaster and sports talk show host for Audacy, Inc. owned sister stations WXYT-FM, WXYT-AM and WWJ in Detroit, MI.

== Broadcasting career ==
=== Education and early positions ===
After he graduated from Cooley High School in Detroit, Tony enrolled at Specs Howard School of Media Arts. In 1986, Ortiz began his radio career as an intern at WXYT-AM, where he later he gained a paid position with the station. He first worked as a producer for Michigan State basketball and football. In 1991, Ortiz left WXYT-AM and joined sister station WWJ, going on to produce Detroit Lions football.

In 1994, Ortiz moved from Detroit to work in Houston, TX at KTRH as a reporter and show host covering Houston sports. Ortiz moved from KTRH to competing Houston sports station in KILT in 1999 before returning to Detroit in 2001.

=== Current roles ===
Since 2001 from 2016, Ortiz has provided sideline reports for the Detroit Lions Radio Network. He also co-hosted the network's pre-game show The Lions Roundtable and flagship station WXYT-FM's local pre-game show Lions Game Day. He was joined by play-by-play announcer Dan Miller and color commentator Jim Brandstatter, and on The Lions Round Table, Detroit Free Press Lions beat writer Nick Cotsonika. He is also a Detroit Lions and Detroit Tigers beat reporter for WXYT-FM / AM and provides sports updates during the breaks of some WXYT-FM / AM and WWJ shows. He also hosts a weekly Lions discussion show on the station during the regular season. He also appears on Fox 2 SportsWorks, WJBK-TV's weekly local Detroit sports talk show. He also frequently appears on WJBK Sports segments such as Lions Beat Writer Cross Fire.
