= Detroit Lions Television Network =

Seven television stations that broadcast NFL preseason games

The Detroit Lions Television Network is a network of seven television stations (and one cable/satellite channel) in Michigan and Ohio that broadcast the NFL's Detroit Lions preseason games and related coverage. On May 21, 2015, the Detroit Lions announced a multi-year broadcast partnership with WJBK (Fox 2) and Fox Sports Detroit (now Bally Sports Detroit), where the regional sports network produces the preseason game broadcasts with Fox 2 producing the pre-game and post-game segments. The games air live on Fox 2 and the rest of the Detroit Lions Television Network, with re-airings on Bally Sports Detroit. Most of the stations are affiliates of the Fox network, which airs a majority of Lions regular season games.

The wraparound shows' hosts are Fox 2 sports director and Lions radio announcer Dan Miller, former Lions wide receiver Herman Moore, and Fox 2 sports anchors/reporters Jennifer Hammond and Woody Woodriffe. In 2024, the announcers will be Jason Ross Jr. with play-by-play, Golden Tate with color commentary, and Dannie Rogers with sideline reports. The network also airs the weekly newsmagazine show Inside the Pride which is broadcast at various times on each affiliate.

== Affiliates ==
Callsign	Network affiliation	Virtual channel	DMA
WJBK	Fox	2	Metro Detroit
WXMI-TV	Fox	17	Grand Rapids / Kalamazoo / Battle Creek
WNEM-TV	CBS	5	Flint / Tri-Cities
WUPW	Fox	36	Toledo, Ohio
WSYM-TV	Fox	47	Lansing / Jackson
WFQX-TV	Fox	32	Cadillac / Traverse City / Sault Ste. Marie
WBUP	ABC	10	Ishpeming / Marquette / Houghton
WBKB-DT3	ABC	11.3	Alpena

- Bally Sports Detroit airs repeats only.

== See also ==
- Detroit Lions Radio Network
