= WHLX =

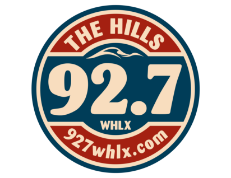
- Marine City, Michigan; United States
- Broadcast area: Port Huron, Michigan
- Frequency: 1590 kHz
- Branding: 92.7 WHLX The Hills

Programming
- Format: AAA; Americana

Ownership
- Owner: Radio First

History
- First air date: December 10, 1951 (as WSDC)
- Last air date: April 6, 2026
- Former call signs: WSDC (1950–1954); WDOG (1954–1967); WSMA (1967–1993); WIFN (1993–1997); WHYT (1997–2000)
- Call sign meaning: Disambiguation of WHLS

Technical information
- Licensing authority: FCC
- Facility ID: 56266
- Class: D
- Power: 1,000 watts day; 102 watts night
- Transmitter coordinates: 42°43′42″N 82°31′15″W
- Translator: 92.7 W224DT ({{{3}}})

Links
- Public license information: Public file; LMS

WHLX (1590 AM) was an Americana radio station licensed to Marine City, Michigan, with a power output of 1,000 watts day and 102 watts at night. The station was owned by Radio First and broadcast from studios on Huron Avenue in Downtown Port Huron. Its programming was simulcast on FM translator W224DT, licensed to Port Huron at 92.7 MHz, with an effective radiated power of 125 watts. The station branded itself as Country, Rock, and Folk 92.7 WHLX The Hills.

WHLX ceased broadcasting on 1590 AM and 92.7 FM on April 6, 2026, with the Americana format moving to a reinvented WPHM. The license was cancelled on April 13.

== History ==
The station started as WSDC in 1951, then WDOG and later became WSMA with country music.

=== Early years ===
The history of this station dates back to December 1947, when Radio St. Clair applied for a construction permit for the station to be built in Algonac, Michigan, about 8 miles south of Marine City, and to operate at a power of 500 watts. The permit was amended the following year to change its proposed city of license from Algonac to Marine City. The year after that, the land on which to build the transmitter facility along Marine City highway was selected, and the license was amended to reflect a power increase from 500 to 1,000 watts, and to adopt a two-tower directional antenna pattern.

WHLX went on the air on December 10, 1951, with the call letters WSDC, operating from its transmitter facility at 5300 Marine City Highway, on the outskirts of Marine City. Doing business as Radio St. Clair, Inc., Jerry Coughlin served as the station's first president and general manager.

By 1954, Coughlin had turned the duties of general manager to sales director John Bell and renamed the station WDOG. Fred Cale assumed sales and management duties by 1960.

Notable staff include Lonnie Barron, a country music artist who also had an airshift at WSDC. He released six records before his untimely death in January 10, 1957 at the age of 26. Barron was shot in the head by a fan's jealous husband at his home in Muttonville.

=== Failed move attempt ===
In November 1963, Radio St. Clair applied for a construction permit to move the station closer to Detroit. The proposed site was located at 2676 Ten Mile Road in Warren, currently the site of Central Industrial Park. Radio St. Clair also petitioned for a power increase from 1,000 to 5,000 watts as well as a modified directional antenna system that would have included a three-tower system. The FCC returned the application a year later, on the grounds of frequency overlap restrictions. Radio St. Clair requested a waiver, which was denied as was the construction permit for the move.

=== First sale ===
In November 1966, Radio St. Clair agreed to sell WDOG to Sommerville Broadcasting Company, owned by Richard S. and Letty J. Sommerville, which was approved by the FCC in February 1967. Later that year, the station, which up to that point, had been licensed to operate only from sunrise to sunset, was granted pre-sunrise authority of 500 watts, which allowed it to sign on two hours prior to local sunrise.

Sommerville also renamed the station WSMA, and adopted a country music format. It maintained this format and call sign for the next 26 years.

A disadvantage that the station had for much of its history was its geographic separation from more profitable markets. Located about 12 miles from any kind of urban sprawl, it had difficulty attaching itself to another community for more profit potential, as retail business in tiny Marine City was unable to provide a steady source of revenue, even during AM's halcyon years. For a time, WSMA maintained a small sales office in Port Huron, across the street from competitors WHLS and WSAQ. Despite the challenges, WSMA produced a modest profit during its early years.

The Port Huron office closed when the station began to fail in the late 1980s, not long after coming under the control of a new owner.

Those failures arose out of an overall lack of dependability of the station, often shutting down operations at sunset (even after being granted nighttime power authorization), and sometimes not going on air at all during holidays and some weekends.

=== Second sale ===
On May 17, 1987, Richard S. Sommerville, who by this time owned WCEN-AM-FM in Mount Pleasant, sold WSMA to Frink, Inc., under a land contract agreement to pay for the station in monthly installments of $1,845. However, in a letter to the FCC dated November 7, 1990, Washington attorney Earl Stanley stated that Sommerville resumed control of WSMA after Frink Inc. failed to meet its financial obligations, prompting a foreclosure civil action in the Circuit Court of St. Clair County.

Frink Inc. was declared in default on May 7, 1990, and was given 180 days to bring its monetary obligations to Sommerville from that date. Frink was required to pay more than $30,000 in unpaid promissory note payments and real estate taxes, according to court papers, putting its total amount owed to more than $150,000. The debts were not satisfied, and as of November 3, 1990, the 181st day of the notice, Sommerville recaptured the license, and assumed the role of trustee.

=== Reborn: WIFN ===
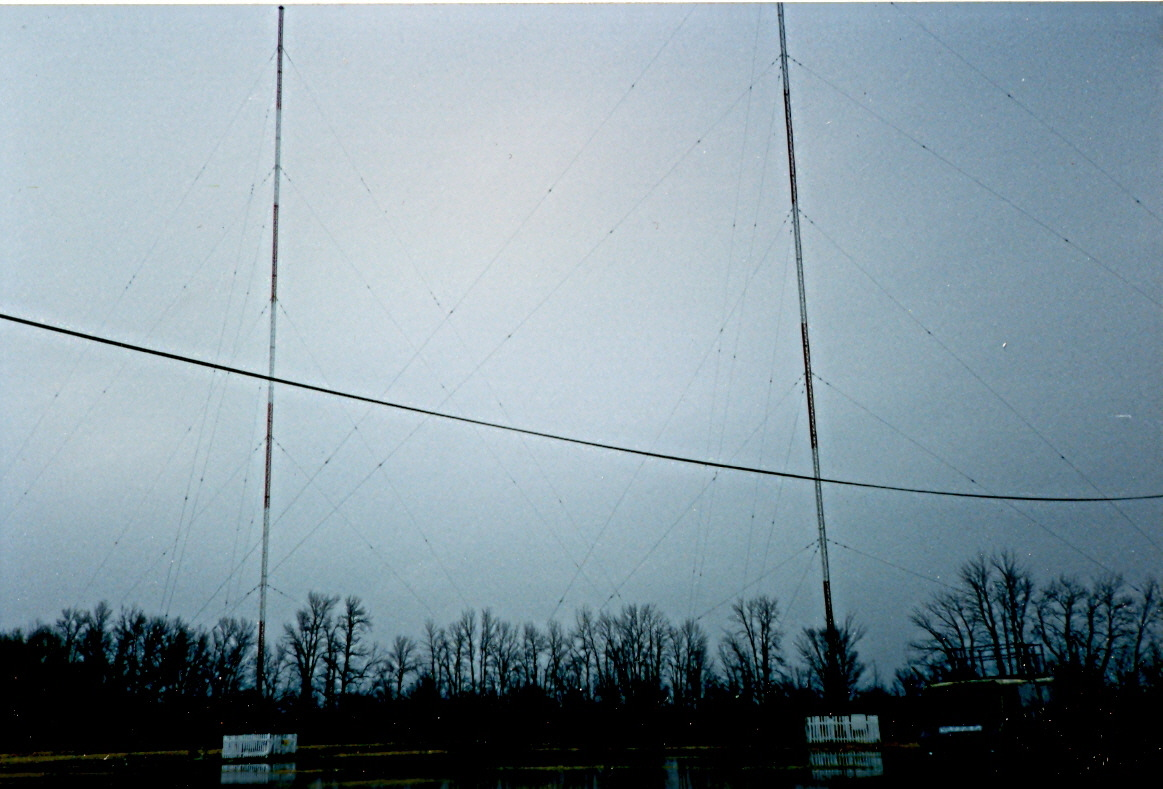
WIFN's two directional antenna broadcast towers, located at 5300 Marine City Highway in Marine City, in 1996. The unused WIFN station remote van sits next to the right tower.

Hoping to restore WSMA to its former glory, broadcasters David Barr and Rick Schremp formed Barr/Schremp Communications in 1993 and took control of WSMA that year. Coincidentally, Barr's father William was the former owner of WATC AM 900 & WZXM FM 95.3 (now 101.5 WMJZ) in Gaylord, 220 miles north of Detroit, before selling it in 1986.

Barr/Schremp Communications changed the station's call letters to WIFN, and began a gradual phase-out of the country music format in favor of personality talk. Under the new format, the station bore such talents such as G. Gordon Liddy, Larry King, Chuck Harder and Sports Byline USA. Ken Hawk and Dave Haze handled news duties, with Marty Simmonds serving as sports director. The station experienced an increase in revenue under the new format and owners.

Barr and Schremp dissolved their partnership two years after taking control of WIFN, with Schremp pursuing other interests. In 1997 Barr sold the station to Hanson Communications, then-licensee of WPHM and WBTI in Port Huron, one of WIFN's longtime competitors. Given multiple job offers after the sale, Barr then moved north to Traverse City, where he assumed a promotions and marketing role with country music powerhouse WTCM.

=== "Real Country" ===
Following completion of the sale in late 1997, country music returned with "Real Country" via satellite from the ABC/SMN radio network, after a brief period of simulcasting with CHR/Hot AC sister station WBTI 96.9 FM. WIFN became WHYT (picking up the calls dumped by Detroit's 96.3 FM, now WDVD) under the "Real Country" format. Hanson Communications also moved the station's on-air operations from its longtime location at 5300 Marine City Highway to its main base of operations at 2379 Military Street in Port Huron.

Most administrative functions were handled by the existing staff of Hanson Communications, and Hanson's sales force dedicated their same aggression to selling WHYT as they did their two other properties.

By 2000, Hanson Communications sold 1590 WHYT to Liggett Communications (now Radio First). Liggett, who was also in the process of acquiring Hanson's competitor, WHLS and WSAQ, decided to co-locate all five stations at 808 Huron Street, which was the main base of operations for WHLS and WSAQ, and had enough space for expansion, unlike the Military Street facility.

=== WHLS simulcast ===
Recognizing the opportunity to extend WHLS's signal to the southern Thumb area of Michigan, Liggett Communications abandoned the "Real Country" format and moniker, and simulcast WHLS's programming. WHYT changed its call letters to WHLX, to more closely match that of its sister station. The move allowed WHLS to be heard as far south as Warren, Michigan in Macomb County and as far north as Sandusky, Michigan in Sanilac County. Its directional covers most of Macomb County, eastern Lapeer County, and most of Lambton County Ontario.

The station very briefly simulcasted WPHM Port Huron in late December 2017 but had reverted to the WHLS simulcast by mid-January 2018.

=== WBTI simulcast ===
On August 31, 2018, WHLX started simulcasting WBTI. With WBTI simulcasting on WHLX, Liggett Communications had WBTI on 3 frequencies as WHLX now has the translator W224DT transmitting on 92.7 in Port Huron. This has extended WBTI's reach from northern Lexington area down to Marine City/Algonac.

=== 92.7 The Gift ===
On November 11, 2018, WHLX started airing a Christmas music format, branded as 92.7 The Gift, Port Huron's Christmas Station. This was also the first time WHLX had carried independent programming since its previous Real Country format as WHYT in 2000. Radio news website Radioinsight.com revealed that the Christmas format was a stunt, and that the station would flip to a new format after the holiday season.

=== 92.7 WHLX The Hills ===
On January 7, 2019, WHLX and its 92.7 translator reverted to a simulcast of sister station 96.9 WBTI. On March 1, 2019, a heartbeat sound effect began being played over the air. WHLX had again broken away from its simulcast for the final time. At 9:27AM that morning, WHLX then launched an adult album alternative/Americana format, branded as "92.7 The Hills". The first song on the new format was Turtles all the Way Down by Sturgill Simpson, followed by The Avett Brothers' Laundry Room.

=== Shutdown ===
On March 2, 2026, it was reported that Radio First would, on April 6, 2026, be consolidating their Port Huron radio signals, and shutting down WHLX 1590, W224DT 92.7 and WPHM 1380. With this move, the current WHLS 1450 would receive the WPHM call sign and keep the 105.5 translator. The majority of programming would be the same as the current WHLX. On the new reinvented WPHM, Detroit Tigers Baseball along with Detroit Lions Football play-by-play coverage will be heard along with Sunday morning Church programming. The licenses will be turned in for the 3 stations after the planned shutdown on April 6.

WHLX and its translator signed off permanently on April 6, 2026, and the license was cancelled a week later.

== Technical ==
WHLX once covered the southern portion of St. Clair County and much of Macomb County, Michigan. WHLX broadcast with 1,000 watts during the day and 102 watts after sunset to protect other larger AM radio stations. WHLX had a two-tower directional pattern pointed towards the north from a transmitter site located along Marine City Highway.
