= WGRT =

Coordinates: 43°04′08″N 82°28′48″W

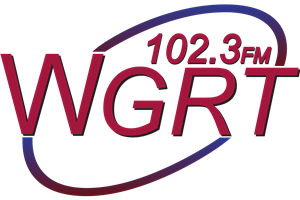
- Port Huron, Michigan; United States
- Broadcast area
- Frequency: 102.3 MHz
- Branding: 102.3 FM WGRT

Programming
- Format: Adult contemporary
- Affiliations: ABC AC (ABC Radio)

Ownership
- Owner: Port Huron Family Radio

History
- First air date: October 18, 1991
- Call sign meaning: Your GReaT Music Station

Technical information
- Licensing authority: FCC
- Facility ID: 53033
- Class: A
- ERP: 3,000 watts
- HAAT: 97 meters (318 ft)

Links
- Public license information: Public file; LMS
- Webcast: Listen Live
- Website: wgrt.com

WGRT (102.3 FM) is an adult contemporary radio station in Port Huron, Michigan. It is owned by Port Huron Family Radio and broadcasts with a power of 3,000 watts. WGRT signed on in October 1991. The station airs a satellite-delivered AC format ("Today's Hits and Yesterday's Favorites") from Citadel Media.

The station can be heard as far as Lapeer County and in parts of northern Macomb and southern Sanilac counties. The station is also heard as far east as Strathroy, Ontario; however, reception in the Canadian portion of WGRT's listening area, as well as areas closer to Detroit and Windsor, may be compromised, following the approval by the CRTC to upgrade the broadcast power of CHST-FM in London, Ontario (65 mi (105 km) east of Port Huron), increasing its maximum ERP from 12,100 to 100,000 watts; and the sign-on of CINA-FM in Windsor in 2012. Like WGRT, CHST-FM and CINA-FM both also broadcast on 102.3 FM.

== History ==
The groundwork for WGRT can be traced back to 1983, when the FCC first "dropped in" an FM license to Port Huron that year. As the local area prospered, it became evident that St. Clair County and the surrounding area could support another local radio station in addition to the five already on the air serving the local community.

Port Huron Family Radio, headed by local pastor Marty Doorn, acquired the license after a lengthy set of competitive hearings from Hanson Communications, licensee of AM competitor WPHM. Hanson Communications ultimately did not prevail and went on to acquire WBTI in Lexington.

The new WGRT 102.3 FM was finally granted permission by the FCC to go on the air in 1991. For a Class A station, WGRT had an unusually powerful signal, reaching more than 40 miles in each direction, and into the Detroit Metropolitan Area's fringes. WGRT went on the air using ABC/SMN's "Starstation" adult contemporary format (now called ABC AC), originating out of Chicago with DJ's Don Sainte-Johnn, Richard Steele, Sonny Taylor, etc. (later Dallas), thus eliminating the expense for a full-time local contingency of on-air personalities, though the station employs a full-time news director actively involved in the community.

Following the sale of the five competing stations in Port Huron to Radio First at the 20th Century, WGRT earned the distinction of being St. Clair County's sole locally owned and operated commercial radio station. (The other locally owned stations in the market - WNFA, WNFR, WRSX, and WORW - are non-commercial and feature either religious or student programming.)

== Sources ==
- Michiguide.com - WGRT History
- About Us - WGRT website
