= Radio First =

Radio broadcasting company

Liggett Communications, LLC
- Type: Limited liability company
- Industry: Radio broadcasting
- Founded: 2000
- Headquarters: Port Huron, Michigan
- Key people: Robert G. Liggett, Jr. James A. Jensen
- Services: Digital media, radio
- Owner: Victoria L. Liggett

Liggett Communications, L.L.C.(d/b/a Radio First) is a privately held radio broadcasting company in Michigan owned by Victoria L. Liggett and James A. Jensen. Liggett Communications is headquartered in Port Huron where it owns three radio stations licensed to St. Clair and Sanilac Counties. These stations operate under the brand name of Radio First where they serve listeners in the Thumb area of Michigan and Southwestern Ontario.

== History ==
=== Liggett Broadcasting (1970-2000) ===
The predecessor to the current company was called Liggett Broadcasting and was founded by Robert Liggett Jr. in 1971. His first station was WSWM in East Lansing, Michigan, acquired from John P. McGoff for $255,955, and renamed WFMK. Liggett acquired more stations in Lansing market and expanded to Grand Rapids, Flint, and Saginaw/Bay City Markets. Liggett Broadcast at its peak operated radio stations in Michigan, New York, Minnesota, South Carolina, Ohio, and California. Liggett's stations were sold to Citadel Broadcasting in 2000, with Liggett becoming a member of Citadel's board of directors.

In 2000, Liggett became the owner of Big Boy Restaurants, headquartered in Warren, Michigan.

=== Liggett Communications (1999-present) ===
In 1999, Bob Liggett announced he would purchase WHLS 1450 and WSAQ 107.1 in Port Huron from the estate of former owner John Wismer. The new company would be called Liggett Communications. Wismer had owned the stations from 1952 until he died in 1999. WSAQ and WHLS were purchased by Liggett for $3.2 million. The new Liggett Communications also entered into an agreement to purchase Hanson Communications, Wismer's crosstown competitor and licensee of WPHM, WBTI, and WHYT (now WHLX). Owner Lee Hanson sold those stations to Liggett for $2.24 million. Lee Hanson died in 2015, his son Eric, owns and operates Hanson Pro Music located next to the former WPHM studios on Military Street. However, Liggett was unsuccessful in buying standalone commercial station WGRT, which remains the only commercial station licensed to St. Clair County not owned by Liggett.

By the end of 2000, Liggett received all necessary FCC approvals to buy both Hanson Communications and Wismer Broadcasting. All five stations became a part of Liggett's new company. For about a year the Hanson stations continued to use their old studio at 2379 Military Street, which is now home to a Coldwel Banker office and Hanson's Pro Music. Wismer's facilities at 808 Huron Avenue were expanded and now house the studios and offices for all five stations. 1380 WPHM, 96.9 WBTI, 107.1 WSAQ, 1590 WHLX, and 1450 WHLS now operate under the collective brand name of Radio First.

On May 15, 2019 control of Liggett Communication's five radio stations and two translators were transferred from Robert G. Liggett, Jr. to Victoria L. Liggett. Robert Liggett died on July 12, 2019.

On April 6, 2026 Liggett Communications consolidated the operations of two of its stations and swapped frequencies and call signs with 1450 WHLS and 1380 WPHM. The licenses for WHLS and WHLX were subsequently canceled April 10th, 2026.

== Community involvement ==
Radio First sponsors an annual local bridal and home expo show held at Blue Water Convention Center. The stations also support many local events, including the March of Dimes "Jail and Bail", the Child Abuse and Neglect Council's "Roof Sit", and Port Huron Police Department's CAPTURE witness tip-line.

== List of radio stations ==
- WBTI, FM 96.9, Lexington, Michigan, Hot Adult Contemporary
- WPHM AM 1450, Port Huron, Michigan, Talk and Americana
  - W288BT FM 105.5, St. Clair, Michigan, (FM translator of WPHM)
- WSAQ, FM 107.1, Port Huron, Michigan, Country Music

=== Former radio stations ===
==== Port Huron ====
- WHLX, AM 1590, Marine City, Michigan, country/rock/folk
  - W224DT FM 92.7, Port Huron, Michigan, country/rock/folk (FM translator of WHLX)
- WHLS, AM 1450, Port Huron, Michigan, active rock (now WPHM)

==== Lansing/East Lansing ====
- WFMK FM 99.1, Lansing, Michigan
- WITL FM 100.7, Lansing, Michigan
- WJIM-FM 97.5, Lansing, Michigan
- WJIM AM 1240, Lansing, Michigan
- WMMQ FM 94.9, East Lansing, Michigan
- WVFN AM 730, East Lansing, Michigan

==== Saginaw/Bay City/Midland ====
- WHNN FM 96.1, Bay City, Michigan
- WBCM AM 1440, Bay City, Michigan (now WMAX (AM))
- WTCF FM 100.5, Carrollton, Michigan (now WSGW-FM)

==== Flint ====
- WFBE FM 95.1, Flint, Michigan
- WTRX AM 1330, Flint, Michigan

==== Detroit ====
- WCLS Detroit, Michigan (now WYCD)

==== Minneapolis/St. Paul ====
- WLOL-FM Minneapolis, Minnesota (now KSJN)

=== Adrian ===
- WABJ AM 1490, Adrian, Michigan
- WQTE FM 95.3. Adrian, Michigan

=== Battle Creek ===
- WBCK AM 930, Battle Creek, Michigan (now WFAT)
- WBCK FM 95.3, Battle Creek, Michigan
- WELL AM 1400, Battle Creek, Michigan (now WBFN)

=== Grand Rapids ===
- WLHT FM 95.7, Grand Rapids, Michigan
- WGRD-FM 97.9, Grand Rapids, Michigan

=== Fresno, California ===
- KCLQ AM 620 Hanford, California (Now KIGS) Liggett bought this station from and sold the station back to the family of Journey front man Steve Perry and was featured on the Raised on Radio album cover.
