= First Light (radio program) =

- Genre: News
- Running time: 1 hour
- Country of origin: United States
- Language(s): English
- Syndicates: NBC Radio Network; Westwood One
- Hosted by: Michael Toscano
- Original release: 1989; 36 years ago – July 29, 2022; 2 years ago
- Website: www.firstlightradio.com
- Podcast: audioboom.com/channels/4392091.rss

First Light was a news program airing on numerous talk radio stations, syndicated by Westwood One, a subsidiary of Cumulus Media. The one-hour live program aired weekdays at 5:00 a.m. Eastern Time and was hosted by Michael Toscano. The show featured reports from ABC News Radio, as well as guest interviews, a call-in segment, and the short-form feature Last Night on The Tonight Show Starring Jimmy Fallon. A weekend version, The Week in Review, for airing on Saturday mornings, was also available to affiliates.

Dirk Van was the show's longtime host from 1989 to 2015, with Evan Haning taking the hosting chores upon Van's retirement. In August 2018, Haning announced he would be stepping away from full-time hosting and Michael Toscano would replace him as host of First Light. Haning would continue to occasionally fill in as host.

An alternate one-hour Westwood One news program, America in The Morning, hosted by John Trout, continues to air at 5 a.m. Eastern Time. While the two broadcasts were separately written and anchored, some stories filed by field reporters were the same.

First Light was the last program that continued to use the original "NBC Radio" branding, via a short announcement at the end of the program and through the program's online and print logo (which included a "sunset orange" variant of the NBC peacock). Westwood One (known as "Dial Global" from 2011 through 2013), owns the remains of the original NBC radio network through its purchase of the original "Westwood One". When Westwood One retired the NBC News Radio news service on December 15, 2014, First Light was rebranded as a "Westwood One" program. Haning is also one of the anchors on the hourly Westwood One newscasts, airing on stations owned by Cumulus Media and other owners.

On June 30, 2022, Westwood One informed affiliates that it would discontinue First Light at the end of July, with America in the Morning being offered to stations as a replacement. In an interview with affiliate WPHM, Toscano noted that it was a business decision by parent company Cumulus Media and not a reflection on the show's performance.
