= Scotty Hanton Marathon =

Defunct marathon in Michigan, United States

The Scotty Hanton Marathon was an annual marathon held in Port Huron, Michigan, United States. The race was first held in 1976 and continued through 2000. It was named after the former Port Huron mayor Oliver M. “Scotty” Hanton following his passing in 1975. The race was contested on public roads in the Port Huron area near the St. Clair River.

== History ==
The Scotty Hanton Marathon was established in 1976. The race became an annual event and expanded in later years to include a half marathon. By the 1980s and 1990s, the marathon was regularly reported in newspapers outside Michigan, such as publications New York State, and Texas, as well as in Canada, often indicating participation by runners traveling from outside the immediate region of Port Huron. The race continued annually until its final edition in 2000. Subsequent newspaper coverage referred to the Scotty Hanton Marathon as a former marathon that was no longer held by the early 21st century. Contemporary reports from the 1980s and 1990s described typical marathon fields numbering in the hundreds, with additional participants when shorter races were held in conjunction with the marathon. Results and finishing times for the Scotty Hanton Marathon were recorded by the Association of Road Racing Statisticians, which documented the event across multiple editions from 1976 through 2000.

== See also ==
- Marathon
- Road running
- Sport in Michigan
- Association of Road Racing Statisticians
