= KIGS =

Radio station in Hanford, California

- Hanford, California; United States
- Broadcast area: Visalia–Tulare, California
- Frequency: 620 kHz
- Branding: Radio Punjab

Programming
- Format: Punjabi language music, talk and news

Ownership
- Owner: Charanjit Singh Batth; (Akal Broadcasting Corporation)

History
- First air date: January 31, 1948
- Former call signs: KNGS (1947–1987); KCLQ (1987–1989)
- Call sign meaning: Kings County, California

Technical information
- Licensing authority: FCC
- Facility ID: 51122
- Class: B
- Power: 1,000 watts
- Transmitter coordinates: 36°19′34.8″N 119°34′2.5″W

Links
- Public license information: Public file; LMS
- Webcast: Listen live
- Website: www.radiopunjab.com

KIGS (620 AM) is a commercial radio station licensed to Hanford, California, United States. It serves the Visalia-Tulare and Fresno radio markets. The station is owned by Charanjit Singh Batth, and it carries programming from "Radio Punjab." Radio Punjab is also heard in San Francisco, Seattle and other West Coast cities, airing Punjabi language music, talk and news for South Asian listeners.

KIGS operates with 1,000 watts around the clock, using a directional antenna at night to avoid interfering with other stations on AM 620. The studios and transmitter are located on Hanford Expressway (California State Route 198) near 6th Avenue in Hanford. The station building was the basis for the cover of Journey's 1986 album, Raised on Radio.

== History ==
On January 31, 1948, the station first signed on as KNGS, owned by the Pereira family (whose son Steve Perry was the lead singer of the rock band Journey from 1977-1987 and again from 1995-1998). Of Portuguese descent, the Pereiras first carried Portuguese-language programming in 1948, expanding to a mostly-Portuguese format (with some Spanish language programming) in 1989.

Lee Smith bought the station in 1972. He acted as general manager and aired a country music format on KIGS, with news supplied by the ABC Entertainment Radio Network. In February 1976, Smith put an FM radio station on the air, 103.7 KKYS (now KFBT).

In 1986, the station was acquired by Bob Liggett of Liggett Broadcasting. He kept the country music format in place but changed the call letters in 1987 to KCLQ.

In 1990, the station was bought back by the Pereira Family, licensed as P & C Broadcasting. A Portuguese music and talk format was once again heard on AM 620. The original call letters "KNGS" were no longer available so the station became KIGS.

On July 27, 2012, the license for the station was transferred from Maria Pereira, who died on February 11, 2012 (given in FCC documents as Maria O. Pereira), to John Pereira, the Special Administrator of Maria Pereira's estate. On July 31, the station temporarily left the air, pending completion of Maria Pereira's estate administration, and the beneficiary's plans for the station. In February 2013, ownership was transferred to her children, Albert Pereira and Odilia Silva.

From May 23, 2013, to October 30, 2014, KIGS returned to the air with sports programming from Fox Sports Radio, before changing its affiliation to NBC Sports Radio soon after. During this time, KIGS served as the Hanford-Tulare affiliate of the Los Angeles Angels baseball radio network.

On October 31, 2014, New Media Broadcasting bought the station from Pereira Communications. The next day, November 1, 2014, KIGS began carrying the Radio Punjab format. The purchase closed on February 3, 2015.
