= WBTI =

Coordinates: 43.209°N 82.536°W

- Lexington, Michigan; United States
- Broadcast area: Sanilac County
- Frequency: 96.9 MHz
- Branding: 96.9 WBTI

Programming
- Format: Hot AC

Ownership
- Owner: Liggett Communications LLC (d/b/a. Radio First)
- Sister stations: WPHM, WSAQ

History
- First air date: 1991
- Former call signs: WYDG (February 1-June 15, 1991); WBTI (June 15, 1991-August 22, 1997); WHYT (August 22-November 17, 1997)

Technical information
- Facility ID: 25989
- Class: A
- ERP: 3,000 watts
- HAAT: 100 meters

Links
- Website: wbti.net

WBTI is a Hot AC radio station licensed to Lexington, Michigan at 96.9 MHz on the FM dial, with an effective radiated power of 3,000 watts. WBTI covers Sanilac County, Michigan and Lambton County, Ontario as well as portions of Lapeer and St. Clair counties. The station is owned by Radio First and broadcasts from studios on Huron Avenue in Downtown Port Huron.

WBTI's transmitter is located south of Lexington off Gardener Line Road in Sanilac County. WBTI provides a rimshot signal to most of Port Huron, Marysville, and Sarnia, Ontario.

== Programming ==
WBTI broadcasts with a 2000's based, gold pop format, with select 90's and early 2010's as well and is positioned as "Port Huron's Hit Music". The format places WBTI between Canadian Top 40 station CFGX-FM and Port Huron mainstream AC station WGRT. WBTI for the past several years has flipped to a Christmas music format during the holidays.

== History ==
WBTI went on the air in July 1991, owned by Timothy D. Martz of Martz Communications. Martz was a Canadian-born broadcaster with ambitions of purchasing or building a series of American radio stations near the border of the United States and Canada with the intent of providing quality radio that would also be of value to Canadian citizens, while at the same time not having to submit to the more rigid standards of programming required by the Canadian Radio-television and Telecommunications Commission (CRTC), and had already had success in another Michigan/Ontario border market - Sault Ste. Marie - with 99.5 Yes-FM. As Sarnia, Ontario was about 25 minutes southeast of Lexington, it fell into this category.

Initially, the station boasted a contemporary hit radio format and the moniker "B96.9, The Killer Bee". Though licensed to Lexington, almost a half-hour north of Port Huron, the station maintained its studios and offices in downtown Port Huron, where it would compete with WPHM, WHLS, WSAQ, WIFN, and WGRT.

However, Martz's ownership of the station would be brief, as the station was sold to Hanson Communications, licensee of WPHM, for $325,000 the following year. Hanson Communications had failed to acquire the construction permit for a new FM in Port Huron after a lengthy series of competitive hearings, and turned its interests towards acquiring WBTI.

Satisfied with the Top 40 format already on the air, Hanson Communications opted to leave it alone at first, but the station gradually shifted in the winter of 1995 to a hot adult contemporary (AC) format, and since then, has shifted back and forth between this format and Top 40, dropping the "Killer Bee" moniker by the end of the 20th century.

Station management has been clever in recent years with their on-air legal IDs, doing their best to keep "WBTI-FM Lexington" to the bare minimum (once per hour per FCC regulations) and using "WBTI Port Huron" several times per hour. When it is the top of the hour WBTI is identified as "WBTI Lexington-Port Huron" with a "WBTI Port Huron" jingle immediately following.

In keeping with an ongoing trend among Hot AC radio stations across the United States, WBTI has dropped most 1980s and 1990s music from rotation and transitioned to a Top 40 sound, reimaging from The Best of the '80s, '90s and Today to Today's Hit Music. This is a return to the station's roots, as it featured such a format throughout the 1990s and until 2002. The change helps differentiate the station more distinctly from rival mainstream AC stations WGRT, CFGX-FM and WTGV-FM. WBTI still plays '90s music on Sunday mornings. In the late hours at night, WBTI has been known to occasionally play some 90s rock and alternative hits that would typically be heard on sister station Rock 105.5. Examples would be Green Day, Eve 6, Kid Rock, and even Candlebox.

Radio personalities Bob O'Dell and J.D. loved the fishbowl aspect of the building. The window allowed for traffic and passers by to interact with the talent.

== Sources ==
- Michiguide.com - WBTI History
