= Blue Water Convention Center =

Convention center located in Port Huron, Michigan

- Interactive map of Blue Water Convention Center
- Address: 800 Harker St
- Location: Port Huron, Michigan
- Coordinates: 42°59′52.5444″N 82°25′39.2412″W
- Owner: County of St. Clair
- Operator: ASM Global
- Type: Convention center

Construction
- Groundbreaking: May 2014
- Opened: April 17, 2015
- Cost: $9 Million
- Architect: Progressive AE
- General contractor: Orion Construction, Inc.

Website
- Official website

The Blue Water Convention Center is a convention center located in Port Huron, Michigan, owned by the County of St. Clair, and operated by ASM Global. The convention center is attached to a DoubleTree hotel which opened in 2013. The convention center houses 40,000 square feet of event space.
