= Port Huron, Michigan =

- City
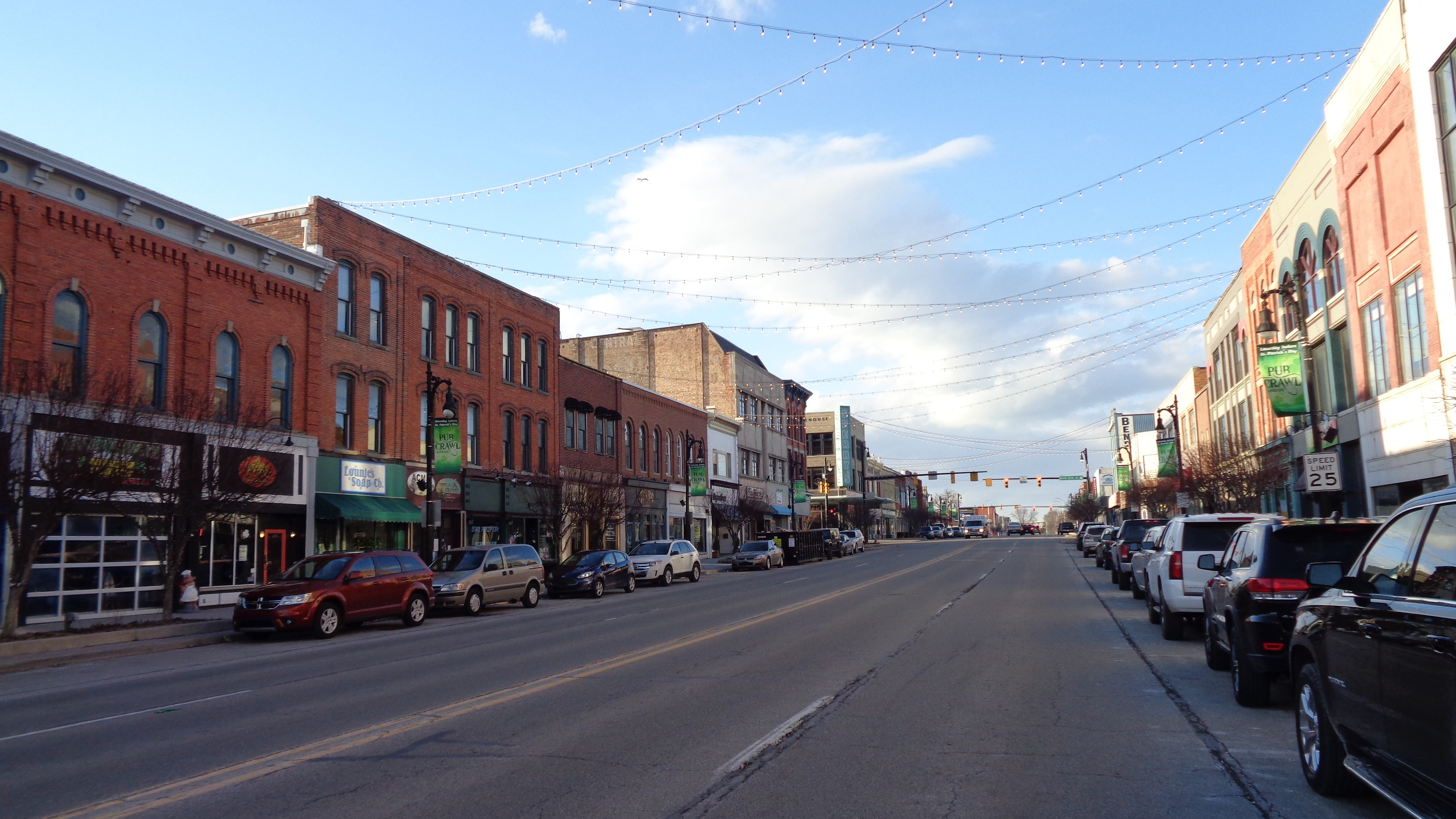
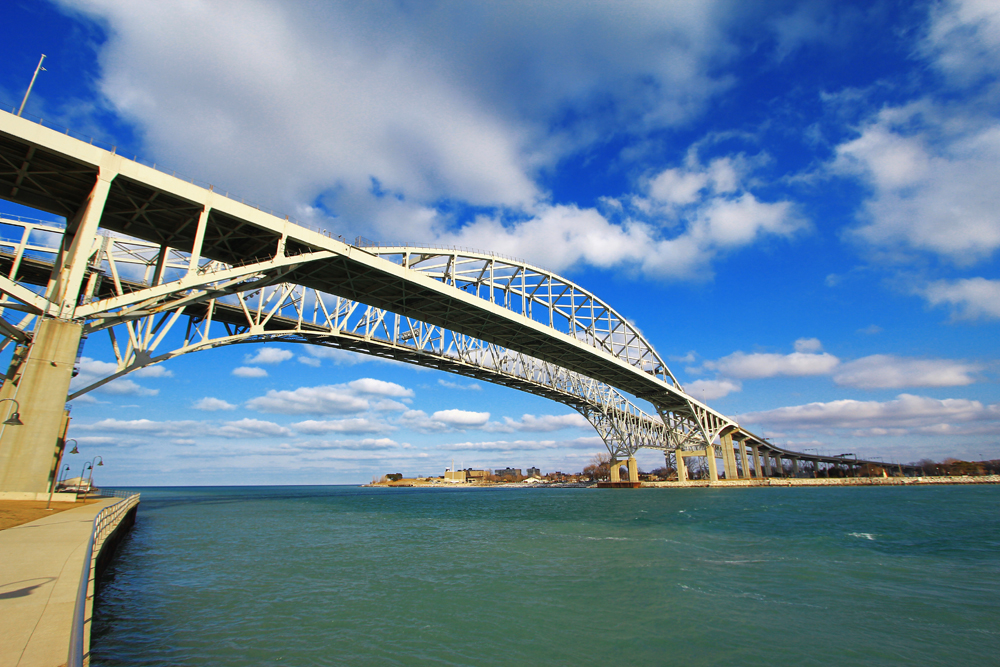
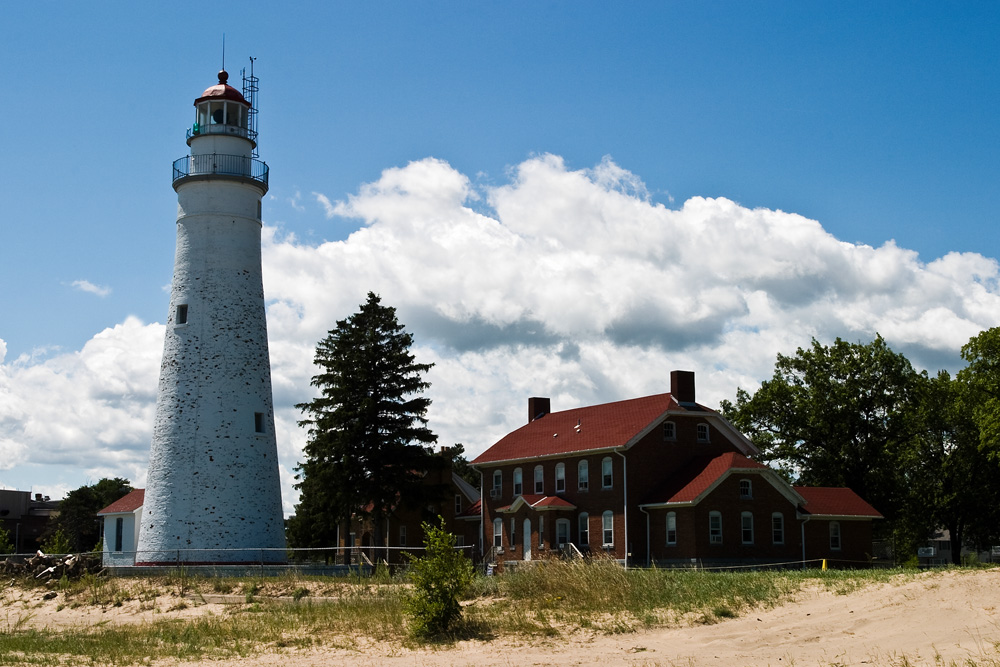
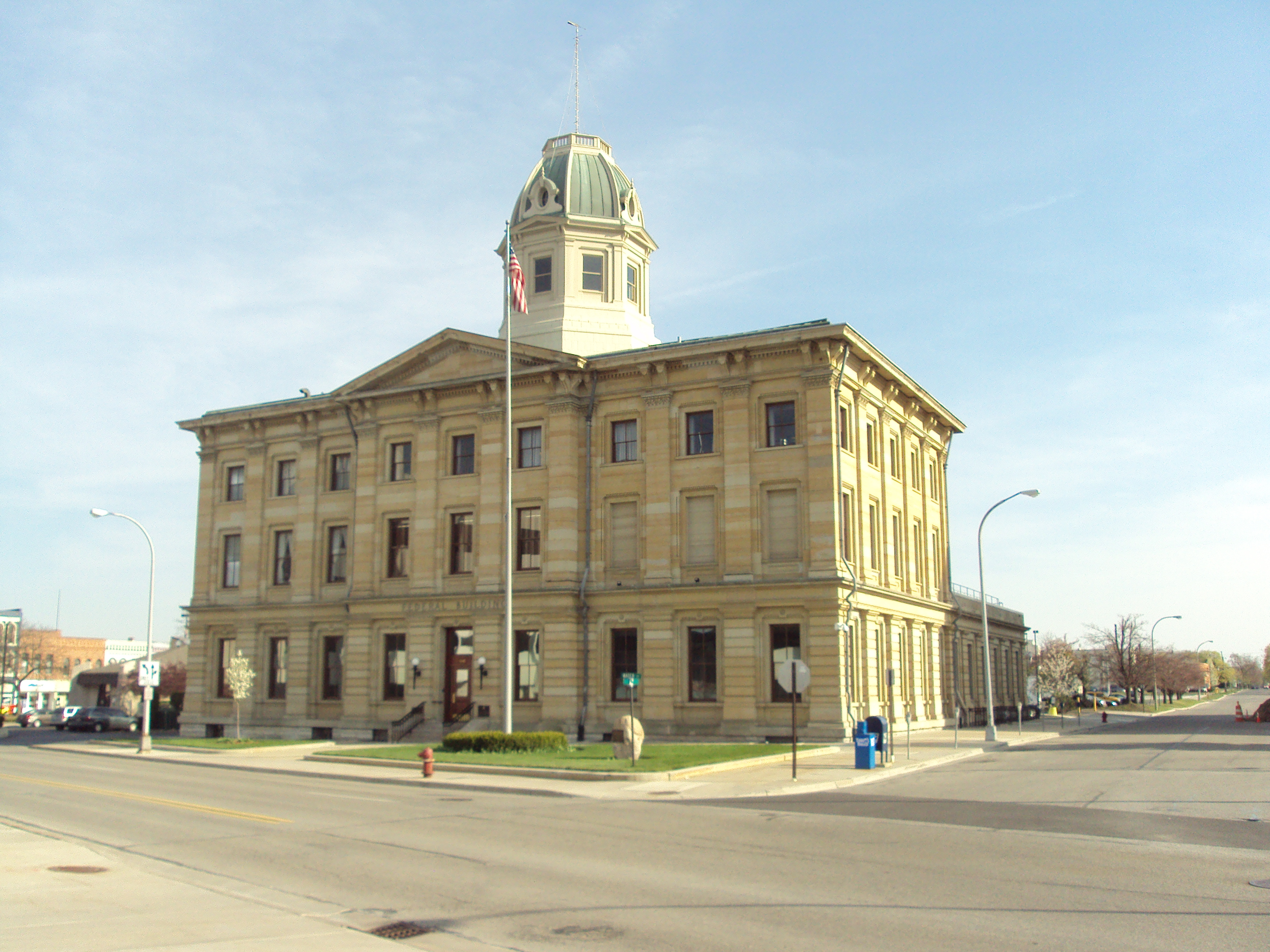
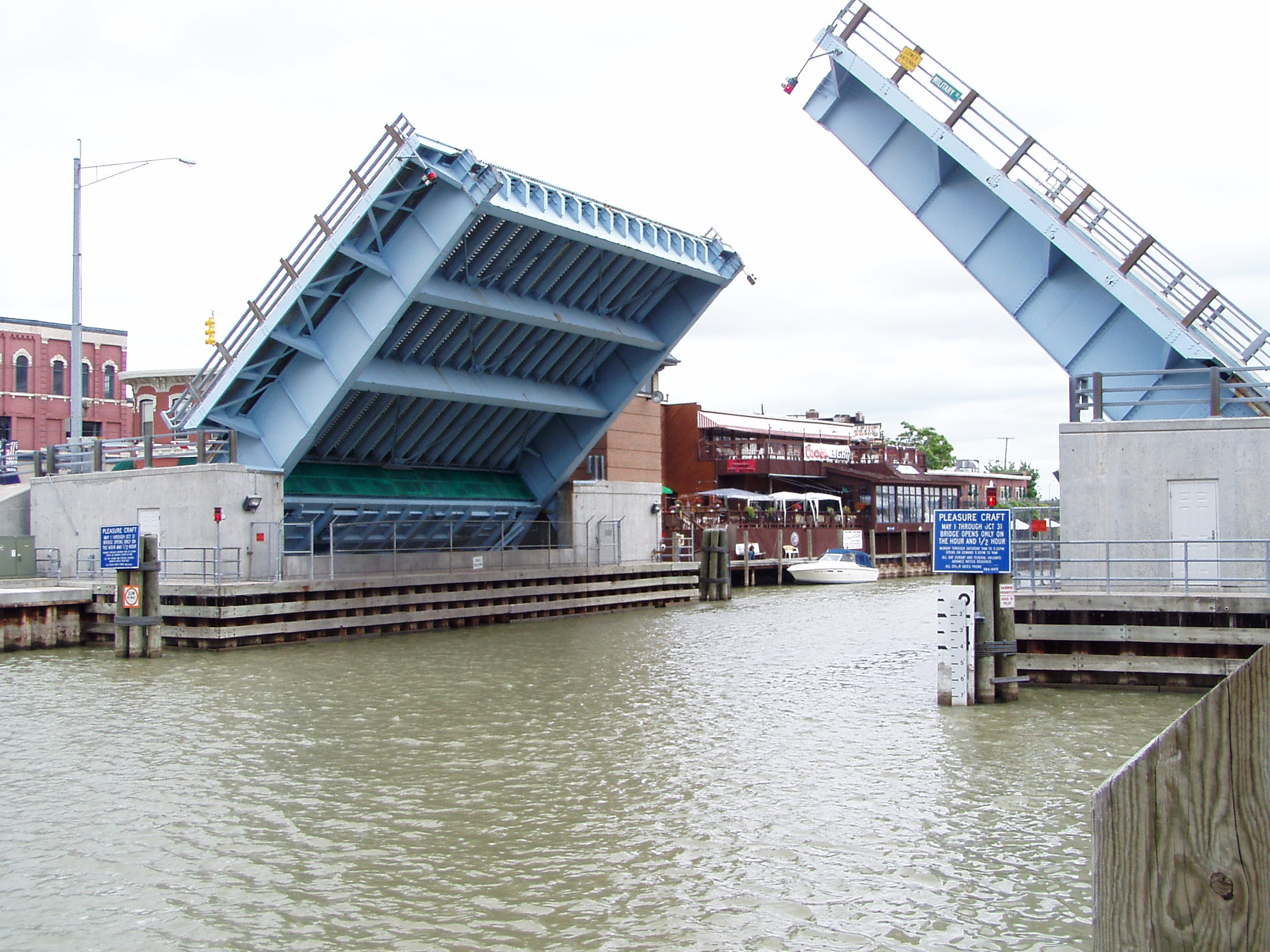
- Images from top to bottom, left to right: Downtown along Huron Avenue, Blue Water Bridge, Fort Gratiot Light, Federal Building and U.S. Courthouse, Seventh Street–Black River Bridge

- Flag Seal
- Nicknames: Maritime Capital of the Great Lakes; Gateway to Canada
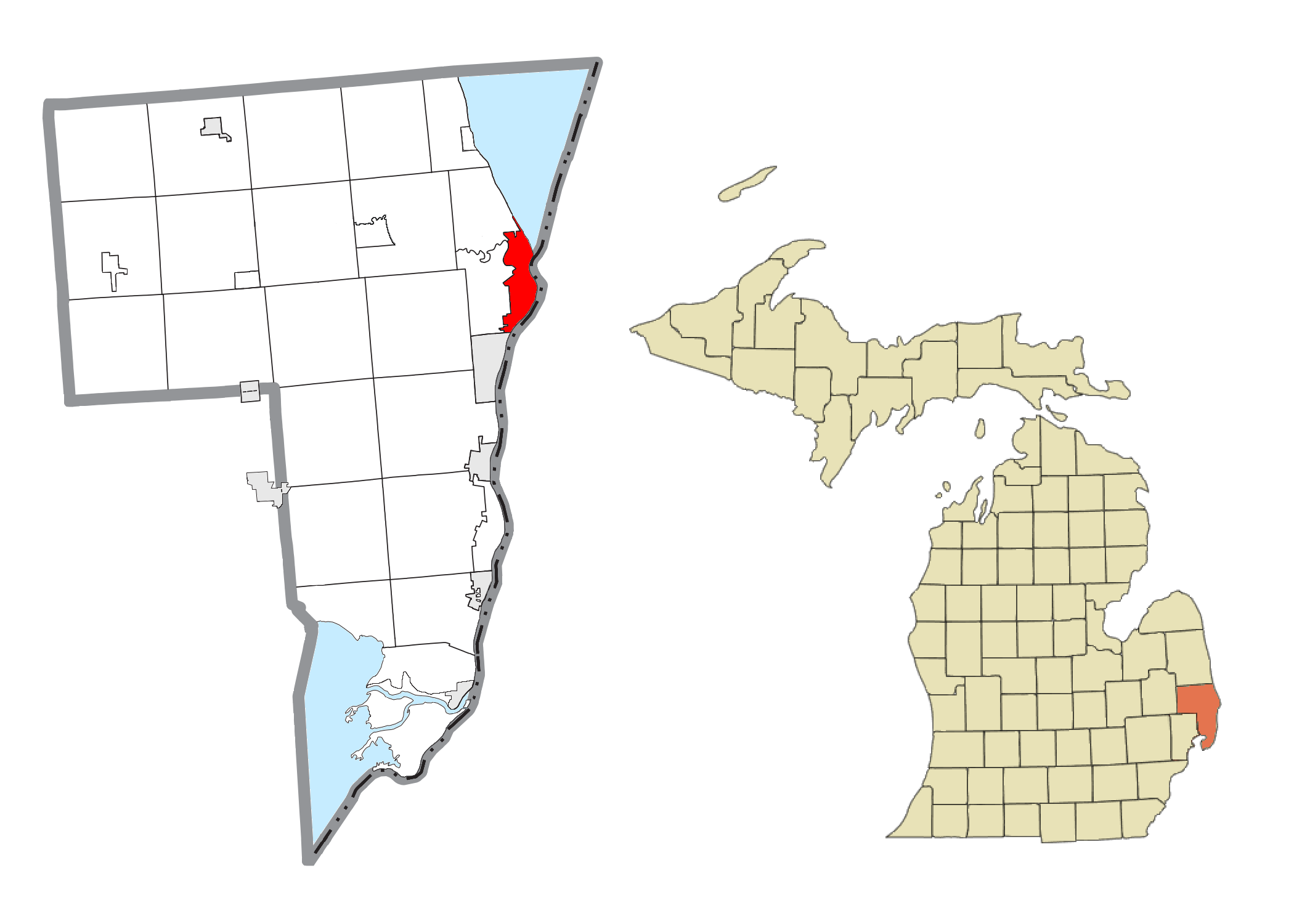
- Location within St. Clair County

- Location within the state of Michigan Location within the United States
- Coordinates: 42°58′30″N 82°25′28″W
- Country: United States
- State: Michigan
- County: St. Clair
- Settled: 1814
- Incorporated: 1849 (village); 1857 (city)

Government
  - Type: Council–manager
  - Mayor: Anita Ashford
  - Clerk: Cyndee Jonseck
  - Manager: James Freed

Area
  - Total: 12.27 sq mi (31.78 km^{2})
  - Land: 8.10 sq mi (20.98 km^{2})
  - Water: 4.17 sq mi (10.80 km^{2})
- Elevation: 604 ft (184 m)

Population (2020)
  - Total: 28,983
  - Density: 3,578.15/sq mi (1,381.53/km^{2})
- Time zone: UTC−5 (Eastern (EST))
  - Summer (DST): UTC−4 (EDT)
- ZIP code(s): 48060, 48061
- Area code: 810
- FIPS code: 26-65820
- GNIS feature ID: 1624839
- Website: Official website

Port Huron is a city in and the county seat of St. Clair County, Michigan, United States. The population was 28,983 at the 2020 census. The city is bordered on the west by Port Huron Township, but the two are administered autonomously. The city is the largest in The Thumb area of Michigan, and principal community in the Blue Water Area, more recently rebranded as Michigan's Thumb Coast, for tourism purposes.

Port Huron is located along the source of the St. Clair River at the southern end of Lake Huron. The city is along the Canada–United States border and directly across the river from Sarnia, Ontario. The two cities are connected by the Blue Water Bridge at the eastern terminus of Interstate 69/Interstate 94. Port Huron has the easternmost point of land in the state of Michigan and is also one of the northernmost areas included in the Detroit–Warren–Dearborn Metropolitan Statistical Area (Metro Detroit).

== History ==
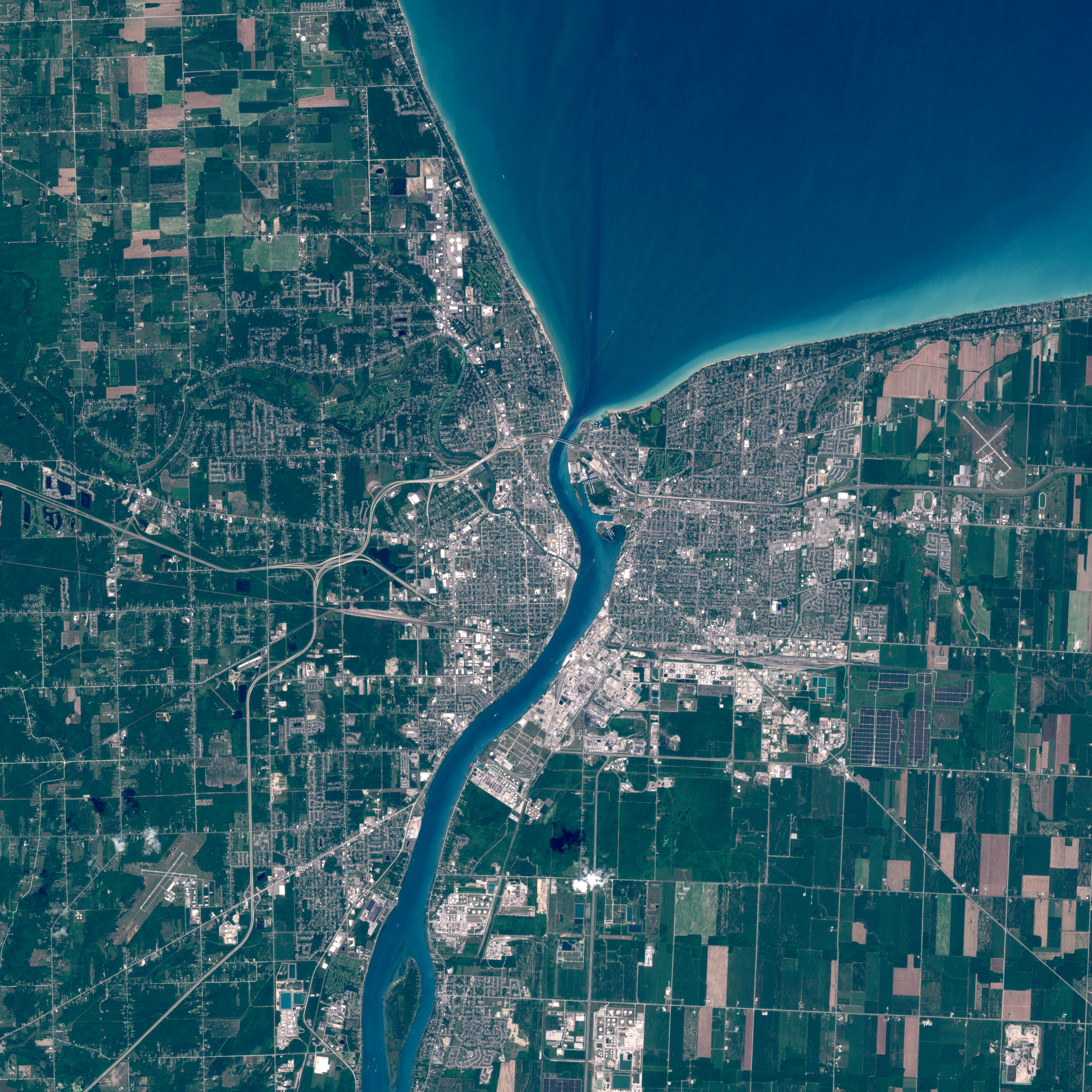
Port Huron (left) sits across the St. Clair River from Sarnia, Ontario (right).

This region was long occupied by the Ojibwa people. French colonists had a temporary trading post and fort at this site in the 17th century.

In 1814, following the War of 1812, the United States established Fort Gratiot at the base of Lake Huron. A community developed around it. The early 19th century was the first time a settlement developed here with a permanent European-American population. In the 19th century, the United States established an Ojibwa reservation in part of what is now Port Huron, in exchange for their cession of lands under treaty for European-American settlement. But in 1836, under Indian Removal, the US forced the Ojibwa to move west of the Mississippi River and resettle in what are now the states of Wisconsin and Minnesota.

Port Huron incorporated in 1857. Its population grew rapidly after the 1850s due a high rate of immigration: workers leaving poverty, famine, and revolutions in Europe were attracted to the successful shipbuilding and lumber industries in Michigan. These industries supported development around the Great Lakes and in the Midwest. In 1859 the city had a total of 4,031 residents; some 1,855, or 46%, were foreign-born or their children (first-generation Americans).

By 1870, Port Huron's population exceeded that of surrounding villages. In 1871, the State Supreme Court designated Port Huron as the county seat of St. Clair County.

On October 8, 1871, the city, as well as places north in Sanilac and Huron counties, burned in the Port Huron Fire of 1871. A series of other fires leveled Holland and Manistee, as well as Peshtigo, Wisconsin and Chicago, Illinois on the same day. The Thumb Fire that occurred a decade later, also engulfed Port Huron.

Port Huron was the site of a lynching of an African-American man in 1889. On May 27, 1889, in the early morning, a mob of white men stormed the county jail to capture 23-year-old Albert Martin. A mixed-race man, he was accused of attacking a woman. They hanged him from the 7th Street Bridge. A memorial was installed in 2018 at the site, recounting Martin's history. The city collaborated with the Equal Justice Initiative on this memorialization.

In 1895 the village of Fort Gratiot, in the vicinity of the former Fort Gratiot, was annexed by the city of Port Huron.

The city was hit by a violent F4 tornado on May 21, 1953, damaging or destroying over 400 structures, killing two, and injuring 68.

The city received the All-America City Award in 1955 and 2005.

In June 1962, the Port Huron Statement, a New Left manifesto, was adopted at a convention of the Students for a Democratic Society. The convention did not take place within the actual city limits of Port Huron, but instead was held at a United Auto Workers retreat north of the city (now part of Lakeport State Park). A historical marker will be erected on the site in 2025.

On November 11, 2017, veterans from around the country, such as Dave Norris, Clitus Schuyler, and Lou Ann Dubuque, joined together at a cemetery in Port Huron to share the significance of Veterans Day.

In April 2023, the Pere Marquette Railway bascule bridge was demolished after a nearly decade long battle between preservationists and the Port Huron Yacht Club. Built in 1931, the structure was eligible for listing on the National Register of Historic Places, and was one of only six similar bridges remaining in the US.

=== Historic sites ===
The following historic sites have been recognized by the State of Michigan through its placement of historic markers.

Fort St. Joseph
The fort was built in 1686 by the French explorer Duluth. This fort was the second European settlement in lower Michigan. This post guarded the upper end of the St. Clair River, the vital waterway joining Lake Erie and Lake Huron. Intended by the French to bar English traders from the upper lakes, the fort in 1687 was the base of a garrison of French and Indian allies. In 1688 the French abandoned this fort. The site was incorporated into Fort Gratiot in 1814. A park has been established at the former site of the fort.
Fort Gratiot Lighthouse
The Fort Gratiot Lighthouse was built in 1829 to replace a tower destroyed by a storm. In the 1860s workers extended the tower to its present height of 84 feet (26 m). The light, automated in 1933, continues to guide shipping on Lake Huron into the narrow and swift-flowing St. Clair River. It was the first lighthouse established in the State of Michigan.
Lightship Huron
From 1935 until 1970, the U.S. lightship Huron was stationed in southern Lake Huron to mark dangerous shoals. After 1940, the Huron was the only lightship operating on the Great Lakes. Retired from Coast Guard Service in 1970, she was presented to the City of Port Huron in 1971.
Grand Trunk Railway Depot
The depot, which is now part of the Port Huron Museum, is where 12-year-old Thomas Edison departed daily on the Port Huron–Detroit run. In 1859, the railroad's first year of operation, Edison convinced the railroad company to let him sell newspapers and confections on the daily trips. He became so successful that he soon placed two newsboys on other Grand Trunks running to Detroit. He made enough money to support himself and to buy chemicals and other experimental materials.
Port Huron Public Library
In 1902 the city of Port Huron secured money from philanthropist Andrew Carnegie to erect a municipal library and arranged for matching operating funds. In 1904, a grand Beaux-Arts-style structure was built at a cost of $45,000. At its dedication, Melvil Dewey, creator of a widely used book classification system, delivered the opening address. The Port Huron Public Library served in its original capacity for over sixty years. In 1967, a larger public library was constructed. The following year the former library was renovated and re-opened as the Port Huron Museum of Arts and History. An addition was constructed in 1988.
Harrington Hotel
This hotel, which opened in 1896, blends Romanesque, Classical, and Queen Anne style architecture. After the hotel closed in 1986, a group of investors bought the structure that same year to convert it into housing for senior citizens. The Harrington Hotel is listed on the National Register of Historic Places.
St. Clair Tunnel
This, the original St. Clair Tunnel, crossed under the St. Clair River to link Port Huron with Canada by rail. It was the first international submarine railway tunnel in the world. The tunnel's total length is 6,025 feet (1,836 m), with 2,290 feet (700 m) underwater. Construction completed in 1891, and the tunnel opened for use. Tunnel operations were electrified in 1908; half a century later, they were converted to use diesel fuel. Tracks were lowered in 1949 to accommodate larger freight cars. During World War I, a plot to blast the tunnel was foiled. A second, more modern railway tunnel began operation in 1995.

=== Historic photographs ===
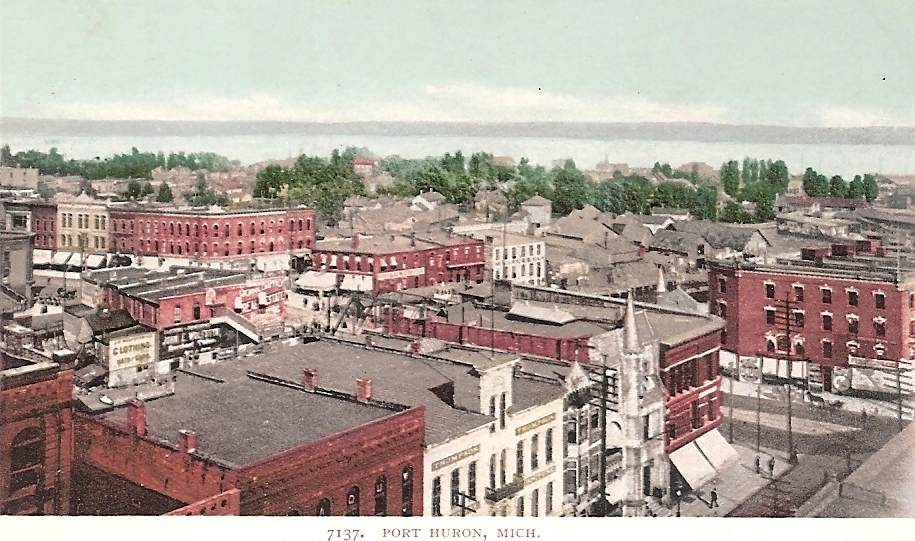
Port Huron c. 1902

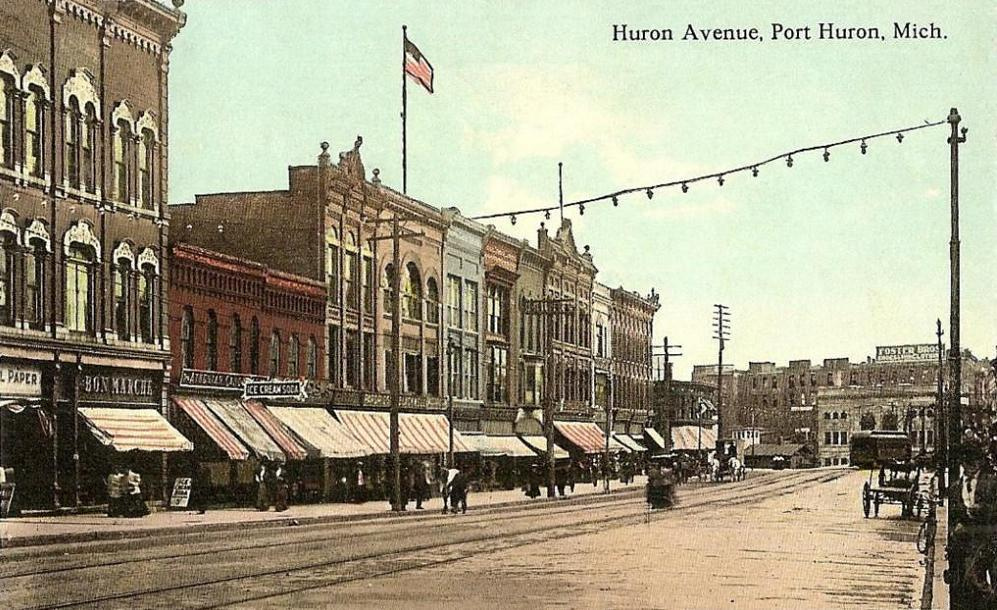
Huron Avenue in 1912

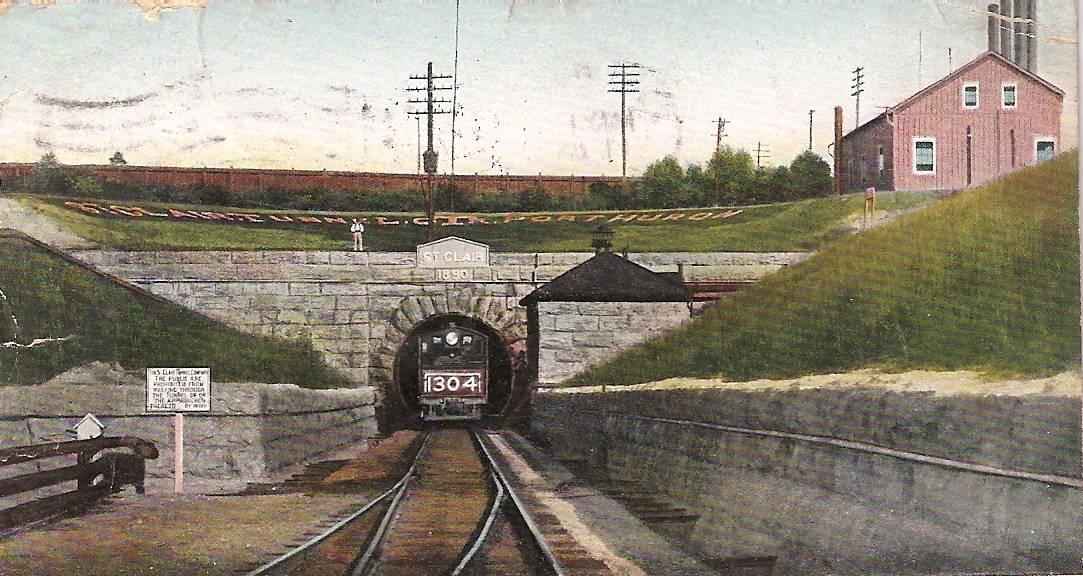
St. Clair Tunnel in 1907

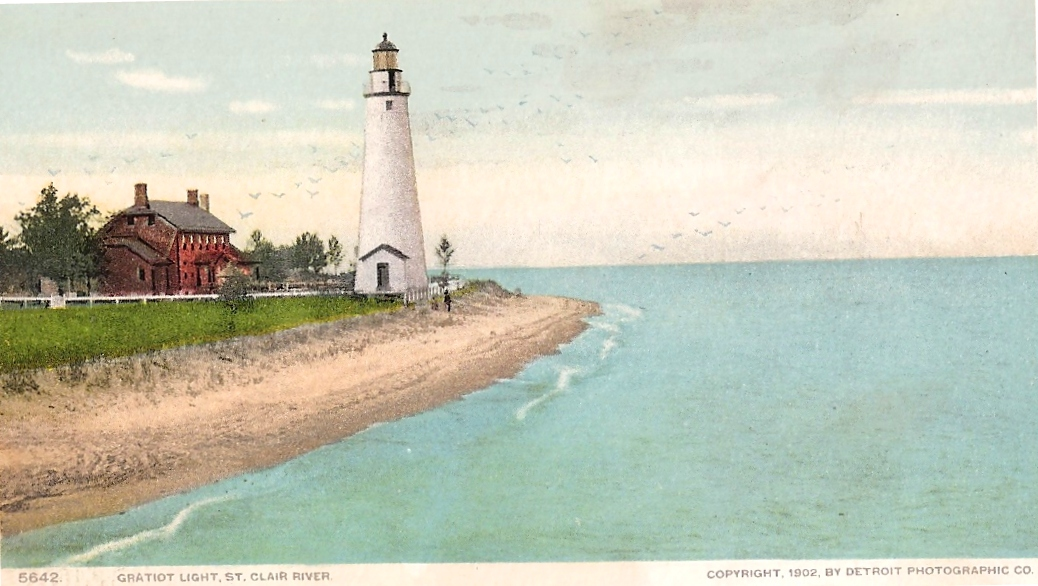
Gratiot Lighthouse in 1902

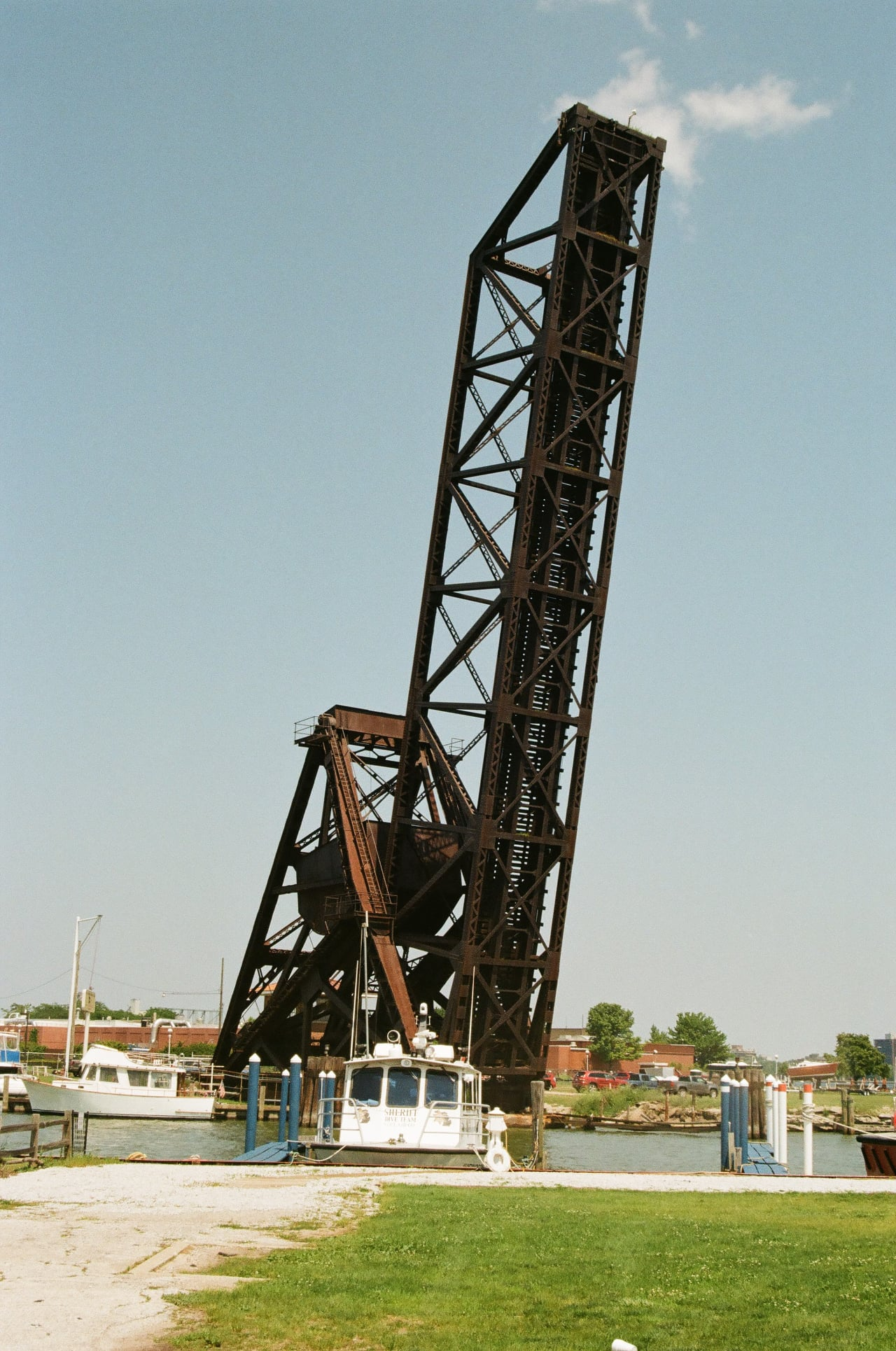
The Pere Marquette Railway bridge as seen in 2021; it was demolished in 2023.

== Geography ==
According to the United States Census Bureau, the city has a total area of 12.26 square miles (31.75 km^{2}), of which 8.08 square miles (20.93 km^{2}) is land and 4.18 square miles (10.83 km^{2}) is water. The city is considered to be part of the Thumb area of East-Central Michigan, also called the Blue Water Area. The easternmost point (on land) of Michigan can be found in Port Huron, near the site of the Municipal Office Center and the wastewater treatment plant. The Black River divides the city in half, snaking through Port Huron and emptying into the St. Clair River near Downtown.

=== Climate ===
Port Huron has a humid continental climate (Köppen climate classification: Dfa) with hot summers, cold winters, and rain or snow in all months of the year.

Climate data for Port Huron NOAA Station (1991–2020 normals, extremes 1931–present)
Month	Jan	Feb	Mar	Apr	May	Jun	Jul	Aug	Sep	Oct	Nov	Dec	Year
Record high °F (°C)	64 (18)	69 (21)	82 (28)	87 (31)	96 (36)	102 (39)	103 (39)	102 (39)	101 (38)	90 (32)	81 (27)	66 (19)	103 (39)
Mean maximum °F (°C)	51.0 (10.6)	51.7 (10.9)	65.1 (18.4)	77.0 (25.0)	86.7 (30.4)	92.0 (33.3)	93.5 (34.2)	91.8 (33.2)	88.7 (31.5)	79.0 (26.1)	64.4 (18.0)	54.0 (12.2)	95.3 (35.2)
Mean daily maximum °F (°C)	30.9 (−0.6)	33.3 (0.7)	42.2 (5.7)	54.2 (12.3)	66.7 (19.3)	76.4 (24.7)	81.3 (27.4)	79.7 (26.5)	73.1 (22.8)	60.5 (15.8)	46.9 (8.3)	36.0 (2.2)	56.8 (13.8)
Daily mean °F (°C)	25.4 (−3.7)	26.9 (−2.8)	35.2 (1.8)	46.1 (7.8)	57.7 (14.3)	67.6 (19.8)	73.3 (22.9)	71.8 (22.1)	65.0 (18.3)	53.2 (11.8)	41.0 (5.0)	31.2 (−0.4)	49.5 (9.7)
Mean daily minimum °F (°C)	19.9 (−6.7)	20.5 (−6.4)	28.3 (−2.1)	38.0 (3.3)	48.8 (9.3)	58.8 (14.9)	65.2 (18.4)	64.0 (17.8)	56.8 (13.8)	46.0 (7.8)	35.2 (1.8)	26.4 (−3.1)	42.3 (5.7)
Mean minimum °F (°C)	1.1 (−17.2)	2.8 (−16.2)	10.8 (−11.8)	24.4 (−4.2)	36.2 (2.3)	46.0 (7.8)	54.3 (12.4)	53.3 (11.8)	42.2 (5.7)	32.5 (0.3)	20.2 (−6.6)	9.7 (−12.4)	−2.5 (−19.2)
Record low °F (°C)	−19 (−28)	−15 (−26)	−7 (−22)	8 (−13)	21 (−6)	32 (0)	35 (2)	37 (3)	25 (−4)	20 (−7)	2 (−17)	−7 (−22)	−19 (−28)
Average precipitation inches (mm)	2.48 (63)	2.06 (52)	2.21 (56)	3.15 (80)	3.53 (90)	3.62 (92)	3.25 (83)	3.14 (80)	3.32 (84)	3.13 (80)	2.81 (71)	2.17 (55)	34.87 (886)
Average snowfall inches (cm)	11.1 (28)	11.4 (29)	4.6 (12)	0.4 (1.0)	0.0 (0.0)	0.0 (0.0)	0.0 (0.0)	0.0 (0.0)	0.0 (0.0)	0.0 (0.0)	1.3 (3.3)	6.7 (17)	35.5 (90)
Average precipitation days (≥ 0.01 in)	14.0	10.3	10.8	12.9	13.0	10.9	10.1	10.3	10.1	12.6	11.8	12.7	139.5
Average snowy days (≥ 0.1 in)	7.4	5.9	2.9	0.6	0.0	0.0	0.0	0.0	0.0	0.0	0.8	4.4	22.0
Source: NOAA

== Demographics ==
Historical population
Census	Pop.	Note	%±
1850	1,584		—
1860	4,371		175.9%
1870	5,973		36.7%
1880	8,883		48.7%
1890	13,543		52.5%
1900	19,158		41.5%
1910	18,863		−1.5%
1920	25,944		37.5%
1930	31,361		20.9%
1940	32,759		4.5%
1950	35,725		9.1%
1960	36,084		1.0%
1970	35,794		−0.8%
1980	33,981		−5.1%
1990	33,694		−0.8%
2000	32,338		−4.0%
2010	30,184		−6.7%
2020	28,983		−4.0%
U.S. Decennial Census

Port Huron is the largest city in the Thumb area, and is a center of industry and trade for the region.

=== 2020 census ===
As of the 2020 census, Port Huron had a population of 28,983. The median age was 38.4 years. 22.6% of residents were under the age of 18 and 16.7% of residents were 65 years of age or older. For every 100 females there were 93.9 males, and for every 100 females age 18 and over there were 89.8 males age 18 and over.

100.0% of residents lived in urban areas, while 0.0% lived in rural areas.

There were 12,318 households in Port Huron, of which 27.2% had children under the age of 18 living in them. Of all households, 30.0% were married-couple households, 23.2% were households with a male householder and no spouse or partner present, and 36.4% were households with a female householder and no spouse or partner present. About 36.7% of all households were made up of individuals and 14.4% had someone living alone who was 65 years of age or older.

There were 13,428 housing units, of which 8.3% were vacant. The homeowner vacancy rate was 1.8% and the rental vacancy rate was 5.9%.

Racial composition as of the 2020 census
Race	Number	Percent
White	23,180	80.0%
Black or African American	2,394	8.3%
American Indian and Alaska Native	220	0.8%
Asian	196	0.7%
Native Hawaiian and Other Pacific Islander	9	0.0%
Some other race	443	1.5%
Two or more races	2,541	8.8%
Hispanic or Latino (of any race)	1,689	5.8%

=== 2010 census ===
As of the census of 2010, there were 30,184 people, 12,177 households, and 7,311 families residing in the city. The population density was 3,735.6 inhabitants per square mile (1,442.3/km^{2}). There were 13,871 housing units at an average density of 1,716.7 per square mile (662.8/km^{2}). The racial makeup of the city was 84.0% White, 9.1% African American, 0.7% Native American, 0.6% Asian, 1.2% from other races, and 4.5% from two or more races. Hispanic or Latino residents of any race were 5.4% of the population.

There were 12,177 households, of which 32.5% had children under the age of 18 living with them, 34.5% were married couples living together, 19.9% had a female householder with no husband present, 5.6% had a male householder with no wife present, and 40.0% were non-families. 33.0% of all households were made up of individuals, and 11.8% had someone living alone who was 65 years of age or older. The average household size was 2.42 and the average family size was 3.03.

The median age in the city was 35.8 years. 25.6% of residents were under the age of 18; 9.9% were between the ages of 18 and 24; 26.3% were from 25 to 44; 25.2% were from 45 to 64; and 13.1% were 65 years of age or older. The gender makeup of the city was 47.8% male and 52.2% female.

According to City Manager James Freed, "the majority of the community is senior citizens"

== Culture ==
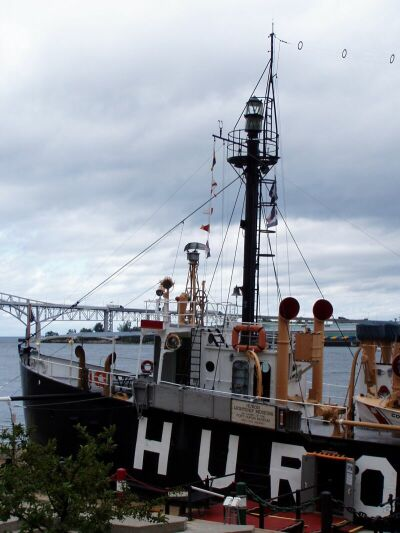
Huron Light Ship Museum

- The Port Huron Museum is a series of four museums, namely:
  - Carnegie Center (Port Huron Museum)
  - Huron Lightship
  - Thomas Edison Depot Museum
  - Fort Gratiot Lighthouse
- The Great Lakes Maritime Center offers opportunities to learn about the history of the Great Lakes. Freighters pass within 100 feet (30 m) of the glass windows, and there is an underwater live camera feed.
- The Desmond District Demons is a horror film festival, held at the end of October annually. The festival focuses on elevating the horror genre, hosting independent film screenings alongside a Dark Arts Exhibition showcasing local artists.
- The Black River Film Society is a community focused on cultivating the areas independent film screenings and host regular film related events, such as premiering Stockholm (2018 film) in Michigan, Tough Guy: The Bob Probert Story and Sincerely Brenda.
- The School for Strings presents over 50 concerts each year with its Fiddle Club, Faculty, and Student Ensembles. It provides music education across the area.
- Each year, the Port Huron to Mackinac Boat Race is held, with a starting point in Port Huron north of the Blue Water Bridge. The race finishes at Mackinac Island, crossing Lake Huron. It is considered by some boaters to be a companion to the longer Chicago Yacht Club Race to Mackinac.
- The Port Huron Civic Theatre began in 1956 by a group of theater lovers. Since 1983, it has used McMorran Place for its productions.
- The Blue Water Film Festival (2010–2014) was held in the fall, which had notables such as Chris Gore, Sid Haig, Curtis Armstrong, Timothy Busfield, Loni Love, Dave Coulier.
- The main branch of the St. Clair County Library is located in downtown Port Huron. The library contains more than 285,300 books, nearly 200 magazine subscriptions, and over 22,700 books on tape, books on compact disc, music compact discs, cassettes, and videos.
- The International Symphony Orchestra of Sarnia, Ontario and Port Huron, Michigan perform events at McMorran Place, Port Huron Northern Theatre and Temple Baptist Church in Sarnia.
- Encompassing over 100 homes and buildings, the Olde Town Historic District is Port Huron's first and only residential historic district. The Olde Town Historic Neighborhood Association is an organization working to preserve historic architecture in Port Huron. They have hosted an annual historic home tour, flower plantings and beautification and neighborhood Christmas decorations.
- The Welkin Base Ball Club is Port Huron's historic vintage base ball team. Modeled on Port Huron's first baseball club from 1867, the Welkin Base Ball Club re-creates the time of baseball's roots.

=== Pop culture ===
The premieres of Young Tom Edison starring Mickey Rooney took place in Port Huron in 1940.

A reference to the Port Huron Statement was made in the Coen brothers 1998 film The Big Lebowski.

The Blue Water Bridge was used for a car crash and explosion scene in the 2000 flim Bless the Child.

In 2009, the TV show Criminal Minds used Port Huron and Detroit as locations for an episode involving crossing the border into Ontario.

== Sports ==
=== Hockey ===
Port Huron has had a strong tradition of minor league hockey for many years. The Port Huron Flags played in the original International Hockey League from 1962 to 1981, winning three Turner Cup championships in 1966, 1971 and 1972. Its leading career scorers were Ken Gribbons, who played most of his career in the IHL; Bob McCammon, a lifelong IHLer who went on to be a National Hockey League coach with the Philadelphia Flyers and the Vancouver Canucks; Bill LeCaine and Larry Gould, who played a handful of NHL games with the Pittsburgh Penguins and the Vancouver Canucks, respectively. Legendary NHL hockey broadcaster Mike Emrick started his career doing play-by-play hockey for the Flags on AM 1450 WHLS in the mid 1970s. Emrick would go on to broadcast Olympic hockey games and Stanley Cup playoffs for NBC Sports, and is a frequent guest contributor to sister station WPHM. Port Huron was also represented in the Colonial Hockey League (also operating under the names United Hockey League and International Hockey League), with franchises from 1996 until the league folded in 2010. Originally called the Border Cats, the team was renamed the Beacons in 2002, the Flags in 2005 and the Icehawks in 2007. Among the more notable players were Bob McKillop, Jason Firth, Tab Lardner and Brent Gretzky. The Port Huron Fighting Falcons of the junior North American Hockey League played at McMorran Place, beginning in 2010 until 2013. The team moved to Connellsville, PA for the 2014 season. The team's name was changed to the Keystone Ice Miners. Port Huron is also home to the Port Huron Prowlers of the Federal Prospects Hockey League.

=== Football ===
The Port Huron Pirates indoor football team dominated the Great Lakes Indoor Football League up until their departure to Flint, MI. McMorran Arena once again hosted indoor football with the Port Huron Predators of the Continental Indoor Football League in 2011. The Predators failed to finish the 2011 season, and were replaced in 2012 by the Port Huron Patriots who also participated in the CIFL.

=== Athletics ===
Following the passing of mayor Oliver M. “Scotty” Hanton in 1975, Port Huron city council named an annual marathon after the former mayor; the Scotty Hanton Marathon was contested annually in Port Huron from 1976 until 2000 and always occurred in the summer.

== Parks ==
The City of Port Huron owns and operates 17 waterfront areas containing 102 acres (0.4 km^{2}) and 3.5 miles (5.6 km) of water frontage. This includes three public beaches and six parks with picnic facilities. The city also has nine scenic turnout sites containing over 250 parking spaces. Port Huron operates the largest municipal marina system in the state and has five separate locations for boat mooring.

The city has 14 public parks, 4 smaller-sized “tot” parks, 19 playgrounds (City owned), 9 playgrounds (School owned), 33 tennis courts, including 16 at schools and 6 indoors, 3 public beaches, 4 public swimming pools, 1 community center, and 1 public parkway.

== Government ==
The city government is organized under a council–manager government form. The City Council is responsible for appointing a city manager, who is the chief administrative officer of the city. The manager supervises the administrative affairs of the city and carries out the policies established by the City Council. As the Chief Administrative Officer, the City Manager is responsible for the organization of the administrative branch and has the power to appoint and remove administrative officers who are responsible for the operation of departments which carry out specific functions. The City Council consists of seven elected officials—a mayor and six council members. Beginning with the 2011 election, citizens voted separately for Mayor and Council. Council members will serve staggered four-year terms and the mayor will serve a two-year term. The city levies an income tax of 1 percent on residents and 0.5 percent on nonresidents.

The current mayor is Anita Ashford, who was elected in November 2024 to her first two year term after defeating eight term incumbent Pauline Repp.

Port Huron lies in the 64th State House District and is represented by Republican Joseph G. Pavlov. In the State Senate, Port Huron is represented by Dan Lauwers in the 25th State Senate District.

Federally, Port Huron is part of Michigan's 9th Congressional District, represented by Republican Lisa McClain, elected in 2022.

=== Backyard chicken-keeping ===
In early 2025, residents of Port Huron, Michigan, initiated efforts to legalize the keeping of backyard chickens within city limits. Advocates highlighted concerns about food insecurity, noting that approximately one in twelve families in Port Huron struggle with access to nutritious food. They argued that allowing residents to raise chickens could provide a sustainable source of protein and foster community resilience through the sharing of surplus eggs.

On March 10, 2025, the Port Huron City Council discussed a proposal to amend local ordinances to permit residents to keep up to five hens on properties of at least a quarter-acre. Advocates emphasized benefits such as enhanced sustainability, reduced reliance on external food supply chains, and alignment with practices in other Michigan cities like Grand Rapids and Ann Arbor. The proposal included stipulations to address concerns about noise and animal welfare, such as prohibiting roosters and collaborating with the St. Clair County Humane Society to manage complaints.

The ordinance amendment was formally introduced on April 14, 2025, with the City Council voting 6–1 in favor. The proposed regulations specify that hens must be confined in a backyard coop with at least one square foot per bird, accompanied by an enclosed run no larger than eight by eight feet. Coops must be situated at least ten feet from property lines and twenty feet from neighboring residences. The ordinance also mandates daily feeding and watering, regular cleaning to prevent vermin and insect infestations, and prohibits keeping hens inside residences, porches, or attached garages.

These developments in Port Huron reflect a broader trend in Michigan toward supporting urban agriculture and self-sufficiency. State Representative Jim DeSana reintroduced legislation in February 2025 aimed at easing zoning restrictions for backyard chickens, proposing that residents with at least a quarter-acre of residential property be allowed to keep up to five hens per quarter-acre, with a maximum of twenty-five hens. The legislation seeks to bolster food security and reduce grocery expenses for families.

== Education ==
High schools

- Port Huron Northern High School
- Port Huron High School
- Harrison Center

Colleges

- St. Clair County Community College

== Economy ==
=== Industry ===
Some of Port Huron's earliest industries were related to the agriculture and forest products industry.

Lumbering in the Port Huron region seems to have started on the Black River about 1827. It quickly became the center of the lumbering industry for the region, in which logs from further north in The Thumb could be floated downriver. The continued need to supply Port Huron's sawmills with fresh timber lead to the development the Port Huron and Northwestern Railroad and fueled the city's booming shipbuilding industry.

A large grain elevator was located on the St. Clair River just north of the current Municipal Office Center. A bean dock was located on the St. Clair River, where dry edible beans from points north in the Thumb were loaded into ships. The dock operated as the Port Huron Terminal Company. Currently the bean dock is used as an event venue.

==== Chicory ====
Port Huron was also a national leader in the chicory coffee substitute industry. Future Congressman Henry McMorran in 1902 started Port Huron's chicory processing plant, located on the Black River near 12th Avenue. A second chicory plant operated at 3rd and Court Streets in Port Huron, which would later be purchased by McMorran's son. The roadside weed which grew in areas of the Thumb and Saginaw Valleys was brought to Port Huron for processing and then shipped worldwide. Chicory was commonly used as a coffee substitute especially in wartime.

==== Munitions ====
Wartime also brought another industry to Port Huron: the Mueller Metals Company, which built a factory in Port Huron in 1917. The plant primarily made shell casings for World War I. The factory was originally owned by the Mueller Co., and since has been spun off into its own entity called Mueller Industries. The Port Huron Factory is still in operation, located on Lapeer Road on the city's west side, where they produce a variety of valves and fittings.

==== Shipbuilding ====
Jenks Shipbuilding Company was founded in 1889, renamed in 1903 as Port Huron Shipbuilding and ceased operations sometime after 1908. The shipyard was found on the north bank of the Black River between Erie Street and Quay Street which is now a parking area for Bowl O Drome and Port Huron Kayak Launch.

Ships built by Jenks include:

- SS Henry Steinbrenner - 1901 bulk freighter, lost in a storm on Lake Superior
- SS John B. Cowle - 1902 bulk freighter
- MS Normac - 1902 former fireboat and floating restaurant
- SS Eastland - 1902 passenger vessel, capsized in Chicago in the worst maritime disaster on the Great Lakes.

==== Steam Tractors ====
The Upton Manufacturing Company moved to Port Huron and began building steam tractors in 1890 under the name of the Port Huron Engine and Thresher Company. The company made steam traction engines, agricultural machinery, and even construction equipment. Over 6,000 total units were built in Port Huron before the factory closed in 1920.

==== Gas and Oil ====
The discovery of oil in nearby Petrolia, Ontario sparked an era of oil speculation, and lead to Michigan's first commercial oil well being drilled in Port Huron in 1886. A total of 21 wells were drilled in the city by 1910, with "small amounts of oil and gas" discovered. Though not much oil was produced in these wells, it did lead to further exploration throughout St. Clair County and Mid-Michigan.

==== Paper making ====
There were two paper mills in Port Huron. The first was the Michigan Sulphite Fibre Company, later Port Huron Sulphite and Paper Company, which opened in 1888 and manufacturing paper clothing at a factory in along the Black River. The company later transitioned to more specialty types of paper, and was sold to the E. B. Eddy Company in 1987, which was acquired by Domtar in 1998. The mill specialized in papers for the medical and food service industries.

Adjacent to the Domtar Mill is the site of the former Acheson Colloids Company. Dr. Edward Acheson in 1908 founded the company, which made a variety of chemical and carbon-based products. The carbon manufactured by Acheson would be used to produce carbon paper at the adjacent Port Huron Paper Company, under the Huron Copysette brand. The factory was purchased by Henkel and closed in 2010. However, Henkel continues to manufacture ink and carbon products using the Acheson name.

Dunn Sulphite Paper Co. was erected upon the shores of Lake Huron in 1924, just north of the Blue Water Bridge. It too was a specialty paper mill and was owned by the Dunn Family of Port Huron for the first quarter-century of operation. After a series of sales to larger corporations, including the James River Corporation, the mill was purchased by a private equity firm in 2003 which re-instated the Dunn name. The Dunn Paper mill closed in 2022, and the remaining Dunn mills were renamed BiOrigin Specialty Products.

Domtar closed the Port Huron mill in 2021. It was announced in 2025 that the former Domtar Mill was sold and would restart production on one if its paper machines under the ownership of Legacy Paper Group.

==== Cement ====
The Peerless Cement Company operated a cement plant just south of the Blue Water Bridge from 1924 to 1973. The waterfront site is now the location of the Edison Inn and Blue Water Convention Center.

==== Automotive ====
The Havers Motor Car Company produced cars in Port Huron from 1911 until 1914 in buildings previously used by the Port Huron Engine and Thresher Company.

SMR Automotive manufactures rear view mirrors at facilities in Port Huron and nearby Marysville.

Port Huron-based P.J. Wallbank Spring manufactures components for transmissions.

Port Huron's industrial park is home to many companies that produce plastic components for vehicles, such as Prism Plastics, Huron Plastics Group, and International Automotive Components.

=== Healthcare ===
Port Huron is served by two acute care facilities, McLaren Port Huron (formerly known as Port Huron Hospital), and Lake Huron Medical Center (formerly known as St. Joseph Mercy Hospital Port Huron).

McLaren Health Care Corporation, a nonprofit managed care health care organization based in Flint, purchased the former Port Huron Hospital and began operating the 186-bed facility as Mclaren Port Huron in May 2014.

Lake Huron Medical Center, is a 144-bed facility operated by Ontario, California based Prime Healthcare Services. The for-profit company purchased the former St. Joseph Mercy Port Huron hospital in September 2015 from Trinity Healthcare. Upon completion of the sale, the formerly non-profit Catholic institution converted to a for-profit entity.

=== Finance ===
CF Bancorp, a bank holding company for Citizens Federal Bank, was based in Port Huron. It was closed by regulators in April 2010 after it suffered from bank failure in the aftermath of the 2008 financial crisis.

There are currently four banks with a total of seven branches in the city containing $563 million in deposits, which are, in order of local deposit market share: JPMorgan Chase (2 branches), Huntington Bancshares (3 branches), Eastern Michigan Bank (1 branch), and Northstar Bank (1 branch).

=== Utilities ===
Port Huron's first utility was the Port Huron Gas Light Company, established on April 2, 1970. It was the first of its kind in the city, and one of the first public utilities in the State of Michigan. The "Gas Works" were located on River Street (Now Quay Street) near the 7th Street Bridge where gas was manufactured from coal.

This was soon followed by the establishment of the Excelsior Electric Company in 1884. The company was the first in St. Clair County and one of the earliest in the United States. Electricity was generated at a power plant located on East Water Street near the mouth of the Black River. Both companies would later become absorbed into the Detroit Edison company.

The gas business was later spun off into the Southeastern Michigan Gas Company in 1950. Now known as SEMCO, the gas company is still headquartered in Port Huron and serves customers throughout The Thumb area of Michigan, in the Albion and Battle Creek areas of Southwest Michigan, and in some communities of the Upper Peninsula.

== Media ==
=== Radio ===
The first station to sign on in Port Huron was WAFD, which stood for We Are Ford Dealers. The station was owned by the Albert B. Parfet Company, a local Ford car dealership. WAFD signed on March 4, 1925, and signed off in 1926, with plans to relocate the station to Detroit.

WHLS, coinciding with the opening of the Blue Water Bridge, signed on in 1938. It was founded by Harold Leroy Stevens and Fred Knorr. John Wismer became part owner of the station in 1952. He would later launch the first cable television system in Port Huron and WSAQ in 1983. Wismer died in 1999. WHLS remained the longest continually operated station in the region until it swapped call signs with WPHM on April 6th, 2026 and was subsequently canceled April 10th, 2026.

The Times Herald launched its own radio station in 1947 known as WTTH. That station would later become WPHM, and was bought by Lee Hanson in 1986. WPHM got FM sister station WBTI in 1992. Wismer and Hanson were direct competitors until they were both bought by Bob Liggett's Radio First in 2000.

Port Huron Family Radio is the licensee of stand alone commercial Adult Contemporary station WGRT. Non-commercial stations include WRSX (an affiliate of Michigan Public and NPR), high school station WORW, and religious broadcasters WNFA and WNFR.

==== Local FM ====
- WNFA 88.3 FM, Port Huron, Religious, Blue Water Christian Hit Radio
- WNFR 90.7 FM, Port Huron, Religious, Wonderful News Radio
- WRSX 91.3 FM, Port Huron, "Michigan Public" (news/talk), Port Huron's NPR News Station
- WORW 91.9 FM, Port Huron, Educational, The Wave
- WBGV 92.5 FM, Marlette, Country, The Thumb's Best Country
- WBTI 96.9 FM, Lexington, CHR/Top 40, Today's Hit Music
- WTGV 97.7 FM, Sandusky, Adult Contemporary, Light & Easy Listening
- WGRT 102.3 FM, Port Huron, Adult Contemporary, Your Great Music Station
- W288BT 105.5 FM, St. Clair (relays WHLS AM), Rebroadcasts WPHM
- WSAQ 107.1 FM, Port Huron, Country, Q-Country, The Greatest Country Music of All Time

==== Local AM ====
- WMIC 660 AM, Sandusky (Daytime Only), Full Service/Country, The Thumb's Information Station
- WPHM 1450 AM, Port Huron, AAA/Americana, "Country, Rock, and Folk"
- WPLS727 1610 AM, Port Huron, Travelers' information station - Blue Water Bridge

=== Newspaper ===
- The Times Herald, a daily local newspaper serving St Clair County and Sanilac counties. It is owned by Gannett, which also owns the Detroit Free Press and USA Today.
- Daily editions of the Detroit Free Press and The Detroit News are also available throughout the area.

=== Broadcast television ===
St. Clair County lies in the Detroit television market. Channels available on Comcast are as follows:

==== Metro Detroit ====
- WJBK 2 (Fox)
- WDIV-TV 4 (NBC)
- WXYZ-TV 7 (ABC)
- WMYD 20 (Independent)
- WPXD 31 (Ion)
- WADL 38 (MyNetworkTV)
- WKBD 50 (The CW)
- WTVS 56 (PBS)
- WWJ-TV 62 (CBS)

==== Southwestern Ontario ====
- CBET-DT (9.1 CBC)
- CIII-DT-29 (29.1 Global)

St. Clair County also receives the following stations from the Sarnia / London area, but are currently not carried on cable:

- CKCO-TV-3 42 (CTV)
- CFPL-DT (10.1 CTV Two)
- CHCH-DT-2 (51.1 Independent)
- CICO-DT-59 (33.1 TVOntario)

== Transportation ==
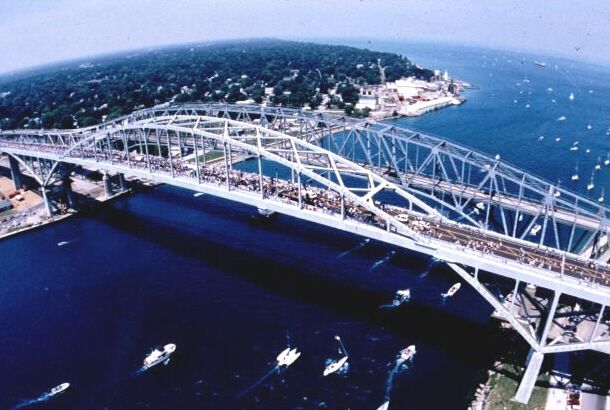
Blue Water Bridge

=== Major highways ===
Two Interstates terminate at the Port Huron-to-Sarnia Blue Water Bridge, and they meet Highway 402.

- I-69 enters the area from the west, coming from Lansing and Flint, terminating at the approach to the Blue Water Bridge in Port Huron, along with I-94. On the Canadian side of the border, in Sarnia, Ontario, the route heads easterly designated as Highway 402. (Once fully completed, the mainline of I-69 will span from the U.S.–Mexico border in Brownsville, Texas, to the U.S.–Canada border in Port Huron, Michigan.)
- I-94 enters the Port Huron area from the southwest, having traversed the entire Metro Detroit region, and, along with I-69, terminates at the approach to the Blue Water Bridge in Port Huron. On the Canadian side of the border, in Sarnia, Ontario, the route heads easterly designated as Highway 402.
- BL I-69
- BL I-94
- M-25 follows the Lake Huron/Saginaw Bay shoreline, beginning in Bay City and ending in at junction with I-94/I-69, and BL I-94/BL I-69 on the north side of the city.
- M-29 begins at BL I-94 in Marysville just south of the city and continues southerly.
- M-136 runs west from M-25 to M-19.

=== Mass transit ===
The Blue Water Area Transit system, created in 1976, includes eight routes in the Port Huron area. Blue Water Transit operates the Blue Water Trolley, which provides a one-hour tour of various local points of interest. Recently, Blue Water Area Transit received a grant from the state to buy new buses for a route between the Port Huron hub and New Baltimore about 30 miles (48 km) south. Commuters could take an express bus traveling down I-94 and get off at the 23 Mile Road SMART Bus stop. At the same time, another bus will travel down M-25 and M-29 and pick up commuters in Marysville, Saint Clair and Algonac before ending up at the same stop on 23 Mile Road. This new system will help people in St. Clair County travel through Metro Detroit.

=== Rail ===
- Amtrak provides intercity passenger rail service on the Blue Water route from Chicago to Port Huron (Amtrak station).
- Two class one freight railroads operate in Port Huron – Canadian National Railway (CN) and CSX Transportation (CSXT) with international connections via the St. Clair Tunnel.
- Via Rail train service from Toronto to Sarnia (part of the Quebec City–Windsor Corridor) is also available; however, this train does not cross the river, requiring passengers to make arrangements for road travel to Port Huron.

=== Airports ===
St. Clair County International Airport is a public airport located five miles (8 km) southwest of the central business district.

== Notable people ==
- Edward Goodrich Acheson (1856–1931), inventor of carborundum
- Emma Eliza Bower (1852–1937) physician, club-woman, and newspaper owner, publisher, editor
- Burt D. Cady, politician
- Jack Campbell, hockey player
- Ezra C. Carleton, mayor and congressman
- Robert Hardy Cleland, judge
- Omar D. Conger, senator for Michigan
- Deepchord, electronic music producer
- Thomas Edison (1847–1931), inventor and entrepreneur, moved to Port Huron in 1854
- Elizabeth Farrand, author and librarian
- Shawn Faulkner, football player
- Eugene Fechet, army officer
- Otto Fetting, religious leader
- Obadiah Gardner, senator for Maine
- Jim Gosger, baseball player
- Dorothy Henry, illustrator, cartoonist, painter
- Bill Hogg, baseball pitcher
- Herbert W. Kalmbach, attorney for President Richard Nixon
- Fred Lamlein, baseball player
- Michael Mallory, author
- Steve Mazur, guitarist
- William McColl, clarinetist
- Robert J. McIntosh, politician and pilot
- Terry McMillan, author
- Henry McMorran, businessman and congressman
- Marko Mitchell, football wide receiver
- Colleen Moore, silent movie era actress
- John Morrow, football center
- Jason Motte, baseball pitcher
- Robert C. Odle Jr., lawyer
- Clifford Patrick O'Sullivan, judge
- Dick Van Raaphorst, football placekicker
- Kevin Rivers, tech businessman and songwriter
- Mary Alma Ryan, Catholic nun and superior of the school that became Saint Mary-of-the-Woods College.
- Frank Secory, baseball player and umpire
- Frederick C. Sherman, admiral
- Annah May Soule (1859–1905), professor at Mount Holyoke College
- Nina Spalding Stevens (1876–1959), museum director
- Sara Stokes, singer
- Dennis Sullivan, mathematician
- John Swainson (1925–1994), Governor of Michigan and a Justice of the Michigan Supreme Court
- Stephan Thernstrom, professor and author
- Harold Sines Vance, businessman and government official
- Kris Vernarsky, hockey player
- Felix Watts, inventor
- Harry Wismer, broadcaster and sports team owner
- James Kamsickas, businessman
- Eric Tulsky, GM Carolina Hurricanes, 2026 Stanley Cup Champion
- Braiden McGregor, football player for University of Michigan and New York Jets

== See also ==
- Port Huron Statement
- Shipwrecks of the 1913 Great Lakes storm
- Blue Water River Walk
- That Certain Feeling
