= WSAQ =

Coordinates: 42.977°N 82.464°W

- Port Huron, Michigan; United States
- Broadcast area: St. Clair County
- Frequency: 107.1 MHz
- Branding: Q-Country 107

Programming
- Format: Country

Ownership
- Owner: Liggett Communications LLC (d/b/a. Radio First)
- Sister stations: WBTI, WPHM

History
- First air date: August 7, 1964
- Former call signs: WHLS-FM

Technical information
- Licensing authority: FCC
- Facility ID: 73074
- Class: A
- ERP: 6,000 watts
- HAAT: 91 meters

Links
- Public license information: Public file; LMS
- Website: wsaq.com

WSAQ (107.1 FM) is a country music radio station licensed to Port Huron, Michigan, with an effective radiated power of 6,000 watts. WSAQ covers St. Clair County, Michigan, and Lambton County, Ontario, as well as portions of Macomb, Lapeer, and Sanilac counties. The station is owned by Radio First and broadcasts from studios on Huron Avenue in Downtown Port Huron.

== Programming ==
WSAQ has been broadcasting a mainstream country music format since 1982. The station features a heavy rotation of pop-country artists while also mixing in hits from the 1980s through the 2000s. Matt Markham is the station's program director and hosts the weekday morning show, which also includes local news and sports. Longtime Detroit radio personality Chuck Santoni hosts an afternoon show on WSAQ, with various other local personalities heard nights and weekends. On Sunday mornings, the station airs a classic country format. Leslie James hosts the "Sunday Morning Classics" in which she plays request from the past seven decades of country music.

== History ==
In 1964, the station signed on for the first time as WHLS-FM. Featuring a simulcast of the AM station and then later a beautiful music format, it was soon renamed WSAQ. The station adopted a country music format in spring 1982.

In 1999, original owner John Wismer died, and both WHLS and WSAQ were sold to Liggett Communications as part of Wismer's estate. Liggett also acquired then competitor Hanson Communications, owner of 1590 WHLX, 1380 WPHM, and 96.9 WBTI. Wismer's original studios at 808 Huron Avenue in Downtown Port Huron were expanded to accommodate all five stations. All of the Port Huron Liggett stations now operate under the brand name of Radio First.

In late 2009, WSAQ started broadcasting Radio Data System information (RDS).

On December 26, 2019 Sarnia radio station CHOK flipped back to country, giving WSAQ a local competitor. CHOK has a focus on Sarnia, Ontario, while WSAQ has a focus on Port Huron, Michigan.

=== Spring Anniversary Show ===
Every spring in April Q Country hosts the annual Spring Anniversary Show, where the tickets are given away and won by listeners. The event is hosted by Q Country at the McMorran Place Arena. The event has seen people like Blake Shelton, Craig Campbell, and Lee Brice.
