= WPHM =

- Port Huron, Michigan; United States
- Broadcast area: St. Clair County, Michigan
- Frequency: 1450 kHz
- Branding: 105.5 WPHM

Programming
- Format: Talk and Americana
- Affiliations: ABC News Radio; Detroit Lions; Detroit Tigers

Ownership
- Owner: Liggett Communications LLC (d/b/a. Radio First)
- Sister stations: WBTI, WSAQ

History
- First air date: December 6, 1947
- Former call signs: WTTH (1947–1970); WHLS (1970-2026)
- Call sign meaning: Wonderful Port Huron, Michigan

Technical information
- Licensing authority: FCC
- Facility ID: 73075
- Class: c
- Power: 1,000 watts
- Transmitter coordinates: 42°58′37″N 82°27′52″W

Links
- Public license information: Public file; LMS
- Webcast: Listen live
- Website: wphm.net

WPHM (1450 kHz) is a commercial AM radio station in Port Huron, Michigan. The station broadcasts an Americana radio station format. It is owned by Radio First with studios on Huron Avenue in Downtown Port Huron.

WPHM is powered at 1,000 watts. Its programming is also simulcasted on FM Translator W288BT, licensed to St. Clair, Michigan at 105.5 MHz, with an effective radiated power of 49 watts.

Programming includes a local morning talk show with music the rest of the day. Local newscasts are branded as coming from the Blue Water News Network. Most hours begin with an update from ABC News Radio. Play by play sports coverage includes the Detroit Tigers and Detroit Lions.

On April 6, 2026, WPHM swapped call signs with sister station WHLS. The station ceased broadcasting on AM 1380 on April 6, and moved to AM 1450 and it's translator at 105.5 FM, the longtime former home of WHLS.

== History ==
=== WTTH ===
The station signed on the air on December 6, 1947. Its original call sign was WTTH, which stood for the owner, The Times Herald, Port Huron's only daily newspaper. It was originally powered at 1,000 watts.

The newspaper operated the station from its debut until December 1967, when it was sold to Enterform, Inc. That name derived from the words ENTERtainment and inFORMation. The station continued to operate from the original WTTH studio location in the newspaper building after the sale to Enterform, which boasted a large front area originally used for performing live radio programs. It also once hosted Paul Harvey doing his national news program at this remote location.

WTTH originated the "Jail and Bail" fundraiser for the March of Dimes. Morning show host Lee Van Dam is credited with the concept, in which notable local residents would be "locked up" and would have to raise funds in order to post bail. Van Dam would later own stations in Newberry, Michigan including WIHC, and helped the March of Dimes create similar fundraisers in other communities. A telethon-style fundraiser, Jail and Bail would be broadcast over WTTH and later WPHM's airwaves for a total of 61 consecutive years. The final Jail and Bail on WPHM was held in 2017.

=== 1380 becomes WPHM ===
Following its acquisition by Enterform in December 1967, WTTH's call letters were changed to WPHM, to more accurately reflect the station's commitment to community service. In 1978, Enterform moved the studio to the newly remodeled and outfitted location at 2379 Military Street, and updated the studio-transmitter audio link from the old telephone line to a microwave system. In 1986, Enterform sold WPHM to Hanson Communications.

Though much of WPHM's history did not involve a co-owned FM station to enhance its profitability, it didn't need one. Somewhat unusual for a market this size was that two AM stations dominated the radio landscape, both with programming that included highly competitive news departments. Its advantage over longtime crosstown rival WHLS (a single tower 1000 watt "Local" station) was its powerful "Regional" signal of 5,000 watts, boasting seven towers (six-tower parallelogram daytime, 4 towers inline at night), able to reach listeners north of Port Huron, known as the Thumb area. For this reason, the station was billed for years as "The Big Station in Michigan's Thumb".

WPHM had maintained a longtime agreement with the ABC radio network and the Associated Press, which gave the station the tools it needed to be a local news competitor against WHLS and sister station WSAQ. It was that and longtime morning personality John Hill (who retired in 2002 before his death in 2012) that established WPHM in St. Clair County. WPHM was also the first in the market (even among its Detroit counterparts) to invest in hard-disk computer-based on-air technology in the early 1990s.

WPHM for decades now has used a jingle package originally produced for WABC in New York by JAM Creative Productions. "Information Radio 1380 WPHM" is sung in place of "News Talk Radio 77 WABC" during these jingles. WABC-themed news and weather beds are also utilized by WPHM, part of the original JAM creative package.

=== WPHM gains an FM sister: B96.9 ===
Despite WPHM's success on its own, Hanson Communications still aspired to buy or build a local FM property. That opportunity finally presented itself in June 1992, when Hanson acquired CHR-formatted WBTI 96.9 FM, licensed to the city of Lexington, north of Port Huron. The station had been on the air for less than a year. The FCC approved the $350,000 sale to Hanson from Martz Communications a month later. WBTI was then moved to WPHM's offices at 2379 Military Street in Port Huron.

As further proof of how dominant WPHM was over its new FM sister, WPHM outbilled WBTI 10 to 1 in 1993.

=== Into the 1990s and the new millennium ===
In 1997, Hanson Communications began negotiations with David Barr, owner and president of Barr/Schremp Communications in Marine City, about 12 miles south of Port Huron. Barr, who was operating syndicated talk-formatted WIFN (now WHLX), wanted to leave the Detroit radio business and pursue other radio opportunities north of Detroit in Traverse City.

Hanson Communications purchased WIFN the following year and, after a brief period of simulcasting WIFN with WBTI, replaced its talk format with one of classic country, provided by ABC/SMN's "Real Country" satellite-based format in Dallas, increasing its portfolio to three stations. Hanson then vacated WIFN's (then WHYT-AM) studio from its co-located transmitter facility at 5300 Marine City Highway and moved programming operations to 2379 Military Street as well.

Lee Hanson died Thursday, November 12, 2015.

=== Liggett and the creation of Radio First ===
In early 2000, Robert Liggett, owner of Big Boy Restaurants and former owner of several Central Michigan radio stations entered into an agreement to purchase Hanson Communications of Port Huron. Liggett also approached WPHM's crosstown competitor Wismer Broadcasting, whose owner and founder died in 1999. By the end of 2000, Liggett received all necessary FCC approvals to buy both Hanson Communications and Wismer Broadcasting. All five stations, including WPHM, became a part of Liggett Communications. For about a year WPHM continued to use the old Hanson studio at 2379 Military Street, which is now home to a Coldwell Banker office and Hanson's Pro Music. Wismer's facilities at 808 Huron Avenue were expanded and now house the studios and offices for all five stations. 1380 WPHM, 96.9 WBTI, 107.1 WSAQ, 1590 WHLX, and 1450 WHLS are collectively known as Radio First.

=== WPHM goes all talk ===
Not long before WPHM changed hands, it gradually moved from its longtime format of adult contemporary and talk to all news and talk. WPHM was one of the first radio stations to pick up syndicated personality Sean Hannity in early 2002. Hannity started his national broadcast on ABC Radio Networks on September 10, 2001, one day before the September 11 attacks.

Morning personality John Hill retired from the station in August 2002 upon completing 35 years of service. Hill later died in 2012. Taking his place would be Paul Miller who started his radio career in Port Huron at WPHM before leaving for other markets. Paul Miller was hired as morning show host in late 2002 and continues to serve the station morning show host weekdays 6 to 10am.

Other conservative personalities filled much of the station's schedule during first decade of the 21st century. For a short period WPHM also carried ESPN Radio nights and weekends. Longtime apolitical fixtures of WPHM's programming were psychologist Dr. Joy Browne, personal finance consultant Dave Ramsey, and overnight personality Joey Reynolds. Browne and Reynolds were distributed WOR Radio Network until it folded in 2012, causing WPHM to replace Dr. Joy Browne with Dennis Miller in the afternoons and Joey Reynolds with Coast to Coast AM overnights.

=== Flip to sports-talk ===
Starting in January 2015, WPHM started airing NBC Sports Radio from Westwood One on the weekends. The affiliation was extended to weekdays later that year. Sports Director Dennis Stuckey was also given his own talk show in January 2015 immediately following the WPHM Morning Show from 10am to noon weekdays.

Stuckey's show was moved to 3 to 5pm in 2016, and then again to 5 to 7pm in 2018. As of June 2021, Stuckey was no longer with Radio First and had started his own local sports website.

=== Back to news-talk ===
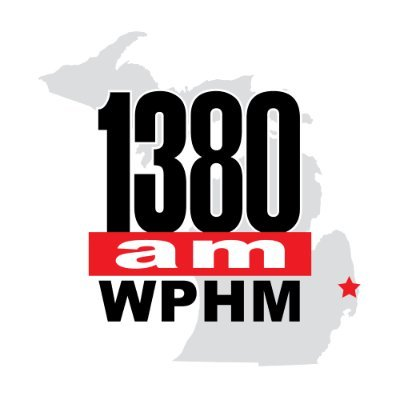
WPHM'S logo as a news talk station.

Longtime news director Bill Gilmer retired in August 2017, after nearly 40 years in broadcasting. As of 2018, Caleb Gordon has assumed both news and programming duties for WPHM.

In January 2018 the station dropped many of its NBC sports-talk shows and returned news-talk programming. Westwood One would later announce the discontinuation of NBC Sports Radio effective the following year. Coast to Coast AM, which continued during the station's brief sport-talk stint, remained in the overnight hours.

Added to the station's schedule in 2018 would be Hugh Hewitt, The Tom Sullivan Show, and Dave Ramsey. In January 2023, WPHM replaced Hugh Hewitt with Brian Kilmeade and Dave Ramsey with Chad Benson.

One of the longest running spoken word programs on WPHM abruptly came to an end in 2022 with the cancellation of First Light with Michael Toscano distributed by Westwood One. Taking the early morning time slot in First Light's place would be This Morning with Gordon Deal from Compass Media Networks. Also that year, the station revamped its weekend lineup to add more talk shows from Premiere Networks including Bill Handel, Leo Laporte, Gary Sullivan, and Fox Sports Radio.

On June 3, 2024, The Will Cain Show debuted on WPHM in the 6pm time slot. Our American Stories with Lee Habeeb was moved up to 1pm weekdays, taking the place of the Chad Benson Show. This allowed for additional hours of Fox Sports Radio including The Odd Couple hosted by Chris Broussard and Rob Parker weekday evenings.

In April 2025, news and program director Caleb Gordon left the station, and afternoon talk show host Thomas M. Sullivan announced his retirement. On June 2nd, Our American Stories was replaced with The Rich Eisen Show and Tom Sullivan's time slot was filled by The Guy Benson Show.

=== WPHM moves to 1450 and 105.5 ===
On March 2, 2026, it was reported that Radio First, owner of WPHM, would on April 6, 2026 be consolidating it's radio signals in the Port Huron area and shutting down WHLX and WPHM. With this move, the news/talk format heard on WPHM and the rock format on WHLS would be eliminated, the call sign WPHM would be recycled on the current WHLS 1450, and WPHM 1380 along with WHLX 1590 (and its translator) would be shut down on that date, citing burdensome maintenance with the seven tower 1380 signal and significant repairs needed for 1590. The reimagined WPHM would mimic the current WHLX with the music format heard on 1590 moving to 1450 and 105.5 and air Detroit Tigers baseball and Lions football play-by-play coverage along with Sunday morning church programming. The 1380 and 1590 signals will be shut down on April 6, and the licenses will be turned in afterward.

== Notable events ==
As WTTH, the station played a critical role in alerting the public to the 1953 Sarnia tornado. On March 21, 1953, a tornado developed near Smiths Creek and traveled northeast towards Port Huron. Announcer Robin Busse, who had kept listeners informed of the storm as it developed, witnessed the tornado pass within 200 yards of WTTH's Dove Road transmitter site. He is credited with saving numerous lives as the tornado approached the cities of Port Huron and crossed the St. Clair River into Sarnia, Ontario. WTTH was knocked off the air due to the tornado, as were competitors WHLS and CHOK.

In August 2019, a comment made by a candidate for Marysville, Michigan, city council during a "Meet the Candidates" forum hosted by WPHM made national and international news. Jean Cramer was asked about how to grow the city's population and stated she wished to, "Keep Marysville a white community as much as possible." Audio of the exchange, which also included remarks about interracial marriage and immigrants was picked up by outlets including CNN, Washington Post, and New York Times. Cramer would later end her campaign yet still earned 180 votes.

In December 2020, delegates of the electoral college were to convene in the Michigan State Capitol to certify the presidential election in Michigan for Joseph Biden. 81st district State Representative Gary Eisen was interviewed on WPHM the morning of December 14 and vaguely described as a "Hail Mary" effort regarding a plan to prevent electors from casting a vote. When asked if he can assure the public that it will be a safe day in Lansing, and that nobody would get hurt, Eisen replied, "No. I don't know. Because what we're doing today is uncharted." Eisen's comments made statewide and national news, being picked up by outlets such as the Detroit Free Press, Detroit News, and television stations including WILX and CNBC. Eisen would later be stripped of his committee assignments.

WPHM celebrated its 75th anniversary in 2022. Former staffers were interviewed and shared their stories about the station during the morning show. Podcasts were also posted to the station's website. On December 6, 75 years from when the station first went on the air, an anniversary party was held at a local restaurant, in which the station received a proclamation from the city and gave away commemorative keepsakes.

== Engineering ==
Originally WTTH was a 1000 watt station broadcasting at 1360 kHz daytime only from a site near 32nd Street and Dove Road in Port Huron Township. The original construction permit was issued by the FCC on March 27, 1947. In December of that year, the station was granted extended hours of operation until 2am.

The frequency of WTTH changed September 7, 1949 to the present day 1380 kHz using a directional three tower antenna array at the Dove Road site. It would remain there until December 1961 when a construction permit was filed to move the station south to St. Clair Township with a seven tower array and a power boost to 5,000 watts. The Times Herald sold the station to Enterform in 1967 which was then followed by a call sign change to WPHM.

WPHM-AM's current array is located south of the city of Marysville in Saint Clair Township off Range Road, located behind a Mobil gas station. The building housing the transmitter equipment is painted with the old WPHM logo. Through much of its early history, the transmitter building was staffed during hours of operation (at that time 6am to 11pm) by FCC licensed engineering personnel, which was a Federal Communications Commission requirement at that time for AM stations with complicated directional antenna systems. While there, the engineering staff would also perform other duties, such as set-up the long tape loops between two reel recorders to provide a "profanity delay" during call-in shows (before the advent of digital delay equipment), log exact times of commercial play to the program log, and take transmitter readings. The transmitter building was no longer staffed after the studio moved to Military Street in 1978, due to the installation of a new remote control system, and by that time, relaxed FCC rules regarding directional antenna system operator presence.

The seven-tower antenna system was more complicated than most AM stations, which required 24 miles (39 km) of #10 copper wire and over a mile of 4-inch-wide (100 mm) copper strap to be buried under the field as a "ground" system. The original transmitter was a Collins 21E, which was 3 connected cabinets approximately 10 feet wide, with the heavy power transformer located separately in the back room. This transmitter was 100% vacuum tube design. Then in 1980, a new, smaller, and more efficient Collins "Power Rock" transmitter was installed as the main, and the original 21E remained as the backup. The new transmitter was mostly solid-state design, with vacuum tubes in the power output section. Also by 1980, the microwave STL system had been upgraded to a stereo pair, partially for redundancy but also in preparation for AM Stereo broadcasting, which never fully materialized in the industry, and was not adopted by WPHM.

Chief engineering staff included George Carroll, from the WTTH days until his retirement in 1982 (d.1991), and David Huston from 1975 until 1987, who after the station's sale to Hanson, moved to northern Michigan to build a house and work with WAIR and WMJZ in Petoskey and Gaylord. Other part-time engineers worked at the transmitter building until the remote control was installed. Eric Hanson, son of Hanson Communications President Lee C. Hanson, served as chief engineer in the latter half of Hanson's ownership.

In 2007, the Collins "Power Rock" failed, causing WPHM to be off the air for nearly a week as a new solid state transmitter was ordered. A Harris Corporation 5 kW DAX was installed as the main transmitter for WPHM. The Collins 21E was scrapped to make room to the new transmitter. The Power Rock was later repaired and is on stand-by as the station's backup. Current engineering staff includes Craig Bowman and Sean Richardson.

== Programming ==
Paul Miller hosts the station's morning show. WPHM airs play-by-play sports coverage of the Michigan State Spartans and all four Detroit professional sports teams. Select University of Michigan basketball games from the Michigan Sports Network also air on WPHM, while football games air on sister station WHLS. Conflicting sports games that would usually air on WPHM such as the Detroit Lions are often moved to sister station WHLS.

National and international news updates come from ABC News Radio and statewide news from the Michigan News Network. WPHM also airs financial reports from Bloomberg Radio, Agricultural news from Brownfield, and weather reports from Weatherology.
