= Fred Knorr =

Frederick August Knorr II
- Born: July 9, 1913; Detroit, Michigan, U.S.
- Died: December 26, 1960 (aged 47); Fort Lauderdale, Florida, U.S.
- Education: Hillsdale College
- Occupations: Radio executive, sports team owner
- Known for: Part-owner and president of the Detroit Tigers

Frederick August Knorr II (July 9, 1913 – December 26, 1960) was an American radio executive and part-owner of the Detroit Tigers in Major League Baseball from 1956 until his death in 1960.

A native of Detroit and a graduate of Hillsdale College in Hillsdale, Michigan, his first job in radio was at WHLS in Port Huron, Michigan, in 1937. During the 1940s, Knorr purchased four Michigan radio stations, including WKMH, which broadcast Tigers games. In 1956, Knorr and fellow radio magnate John Fetzer led an ownership group intending to acquire the Tigers and Briggs Stadium from the Briggs family. The team was sold at a cost of US$5.5 million, with assurances of retaining Walter Briggs Jr., the prior owner, who was given the position of executive vice president. In addition to being owner, Knorr also served as president in 1957 before being replaced by Harvey Hansen on April 19, 1957.

The team under Knorr's new direction supported integration of baseball, a position that was contrary to Walter Briggs Sr.'s longtime segregationist stance. On June 6, 1958, Ozzie Virgil Sr. became the first black player for the Tigers.

In late December 1960, Knorr, 47, died of burns suffered when he accidentally fell into a bathtub of scalding water while vacationing in a Fort Lauderdale, Florida, hotel. Upon his death, Fetzer became majority owner.

== See also ==
- Detroit Tigers/Managers and ownership
