= Dan Miller (sportscaster) =

American sportscaster (born 1962/63)

- Miller in 2023
- Born: 1962 or 1963 (age 63–64); Washington, D.C., U.S.
- Education: George Mason University
- Occupations: Sportscaster; television host
- Years active: 1994–present
- Spouse: Cynthia Miller (died 2026)
- Children: 4
- Sports commentary career
- Team: Detroit Lions (2005–present)
- Genre: Play-by-play
- Sport: National Football League

Dan Miller (born 1962 or 1963) is an American sportscaster and television host based in Detroit, Michigan. He works as the sports director and anchor on WJBK television and as the radio play-by-play announcer on the Detroit Lions Radio Network.

== Early life ==
Miller was born in Washington, D.C. He grew up in Northern Virginia as a fan of the Baltimore Orioles, Baltimore Colts, and Washington Redskins. He attended George Mason University, graduating with a degree in broadcast journalism.

== Career ==
Beginning as a college student, Miller worked as an engineer at WJLA and WTEM, a position he held for 11 years. In 1992, he worked for three months WTNT in Washington, D.C., as an overnight talk show host and Washington Redskins beat reporter. In 1994, he got his first job in TV at WTTG as host of the Washington Redskins pre-game show. In 1995, he joined WJLA-TV as weekend sports anchor. From 1994 to 1997, Miller was a play-by-play announcer for NFL on Fox's regional broadcasts.

In 1997, Miller joined Detroit's WJBK (Fox 2) as sports director and on-air personality. He is the sports director, sports anchor and host of weekly sports discussion show Sports Works on the station.

Since 2005, Miller has been the radio play-by-play announcer for the NFL's Detroit Lions. He is a member of the Detroit Sports Media, founded in 1948 by Detroit Tigers announcer Ty Tyson.

== Memorable calls ==
On December 28, 2008, Miller summed up the Lions' winless 2008 season:

Clock ticks down here in Green Bay. The Lions find themselves in a very familiar position. For sixteen weeks, starting in Atlanta back in September, they took the field thinking this was gonna be their day. Sixteen times they were wrong, and now there are no Sundays left. By record, they are the worst team in league history. Zero and sixteen, those are the numbers that will forever be associated with the Detroit Lions.

On September 27, 2009, Miller commented as the Lions snapped a 19-game losing streak, the second longest in NFL history:

Three receivers to the right side. They'll flood the right. The Lions showing three down linemen. Campbell out of the shotgun. Fourth-and-10. Eight seconds left. Campbell back, throws underneath. It's a hook and lateral and they get it to... Betts, and Betts is going to be taken down. It's going to be a first down but it doesn't matter. Three zeros on the clock. Game over. Losing streak over. Nightmare over. The Lions win it, 19-14!

On November 22, 2009, after the Lions defeated the Cleveland Browns:

Stafford up under center. Last play of the game. Takes the snap. Rolls, throws, endzone. TOUCHDOWN, DETROIT LIONS! BRANDON PETTIGREW! ROOKIE TO ROOKIE! What a finish! And the Lions are an extra point away from the win!

== Personal life ==
Miller is the father of four children with his wife Cynthia, a preschool teacher who died from leptomeningeal cancer on October 10, 2026. Miller was absent from the radio booth for the Lions–Cardinals game that weekend, but received a game ball from Detroit Lions head coach Dan Campbell after the Lions' win against the Cardinals.
