= Detroit Tigers Radio Network =

Radio network broadcasting Detroit Tigers baseball games

- Type: Sportscasting (baseball)
- Country: United States
- Headquarters: Detroit, Michigan
- Broadcast area: Michigan; Ohio (limited); Indiana (limited)
- Owner: Detroit Tigers
- Affiliation: MLB
- Affiliates: 49, including flagship
- Official website: Detroit Tigers Radio Network

The Detroit Tigers Radio Network is an American radio network composed of 49 radio stations which carry English-language coverage of the Detroit Tigers, a professional baseball team in Major League Baseball (MLB). Detroit's WXYT-FM (97.1 FM) serves as the network's flagship. The network also includes 46 affiliates in the U.S. states of Michigan, Ohio, and Indiana: 25 AM stations, 15 of which supplement their signals with one or more low-power FM translators; 21 full-power FM stations; and one HD Radio digital subchannel which supplements its signal with a low-power FM translator. The radio network airs select spring Grapefruit League games, along with all 162 regular season games and all postseason games. Dan Dickerson does play-by-play for the broadcasts (with Greg Gania filling in for occasional games) while color commentary is provided by Bobby Scales or Andy Dirks. Daniella Bruce serves as the in-game reporter and interviewer and Jeff Riger hosts the pre-game and post-game shows. In addition to traditional over-the-air AM and FM broadcasts, network programming airs on SiriusXM satellite radio; and streams online via SiriusXM Internet Radio, TuneIn Premium, and MLB.com Gameday Audio.

== Station list ==
Network stations as of the 2026 Tigers season
City	State	Station	Frequency	Network status
Alma	Michigan	WQBX	104.9 FM	Affiliate
Alpena	Michigan	WHAK-FM	99.9 FM	Affiliate
Ann Arbor	Michigan	WTKA	1050 AM	Affiliate
Ann Arbor	Michigan	W292FW	106.3 FM	WTKA relay
Battle Creek	Michigan	WBCK	95.3 FM	Affiliate
Big Rapids	Michigan	WBRN	1460 AM	Affiliate
Big Rapids	Michigan	W236DZ	95.1 FM	WBRN relay
Big Rapids	Michigan	W243EN	96.5 FM	WBRN relay
Big Rapids	Michigan	W256CC	99.1 FM	WBRN relay
Big Rapids	Michigan	W299BE	107.7 FM	WBRN relay
Cadillac	Michigan	WKAD	93.7 FM	Affiliate
Caro	Michigan	WKYO	1360 AM	Affiliate
Cheboygan	Michigan	WCBY	1240 AM	Affiliate
Detroit	Michigan	WXYT-FM	97.1 FM	Flagship
Escanaba	Michigan	WDBC	680 AM	Affiliate
Escanaba	Michigan	W233CT	94.5 FM	WDBC relay
Frankenmuth	Michigan	W243EO	96.5 FM	WSGW relay
Gladstone	Michigan	W280GB	103.9 FM	WDBC relay
Grand Haven	Michigan	WGHN-FM	92.1 FM	Affiliate
Grand Rapids	Michigan	WFGR	98.7 FM	Affiliate
Hillsdale	Michigan	WCSR-FM	92.1 FM	Affiliate
Holland	Michigan	WHTC	1450 AM	Affiliate
Holland	Michigan	W259CO	99.7 FM	WHTC relay
Houghton	Michigan	WCCY	1400 AM	Affiliate
Houghton	Michigan	W257CZ	99.3 FM	WCCY relay
Indian River	Michigan	W251CW	98.1 FM	Affiliate
Jackson	Michigan	WKHM-HD2*	105.3-2 FM	Affiliate
Jackson	Michigan	W270CJ	101.9 FM	WKHM-HD2 relay
Kalamazoo	Michigan	WKMI	1360 AM	Affiliate
Lansing	Michigan	WJIM	1240 AM	Affiliate
Lansing	Michigan	W295BP	106.9 FM	WJIM relay
Lapeer	Michigan	WQUS	103.1 FM	Affiliate
Ludington	Michigan	WHCH	99.9 FM	Affiliate
Newberry	Michigan	WNBY	1450 AM	Affiliate
Oscoda	Michigan	WWTH	100.7 FM	Affiliate
Petoskey	Michigan	WMBN	1340 AM	Affiliate
Petoskey	Michigan	W284DF	104.7 FM	WMBN relay
Port Huron	Michigan	WPHM	1450 AM	Affiliate
Port Huron	Michigan	W288BT	105.5 FM	WPHM relay
Roscommon	Michigan	WGRY-FM	101.1 FM	Affiliate
Saginaw	Michigan	WSGW	790 AM	Affiliate
Sandusky	Michigan	WTGV-FM	97.7 FM	Affiliate
Sault Ste. Marie	Michigan	WSOO	1230 AM	Affiliate
Sturgis	Michigan	WBET	1230 AM	Affiliate
Sturgis	Michigan	W259CR	99.7 FM	WBET relay
St. Ignace	Michigan	W264CF	100.7 FM	WCBY relay
St. Joseph	Michigan	WSJM-FM	94.9 FM	Affiliate
Traverse City	Michigan	WTCM	580 AM	Affiliate (night games only)
Traverse City	Michigan	WCCW	1310 AM	Affiliate (day games only)
Archbold	Ohio	WMTR-FM	96.1 FM	Affiliate

Map of network stations in Michigan and surrounding states

=== Spanish broadcasts ===
In 2023, Carlos Guillén, Bárbaro Garbey and Mari Montes called 22 games in Spanish on WXYT 1270 AM in Detroit.

In 2025, all home and postseason games were called on WDTW 1310 AM and 107.9 FM.

== History and former broadcasters ==
- Before merging with WXYT-FM, WXYT/1270 was the sole flagship station from 2001–2007.
- From 1964–2000, Detroit's WJR was the Tigers' exclusive radio flagship. As a maximum-power clear-channel station, Tigers games on WJR could be received from hundreds of miles away on warm, clear nights.
- Other former Tigers flagships include WWJ, WJBK (currently known as WLQV) and WKMH (currently known as WDTW).
- The Tigers' most famous announcer is Ford C. Frick Award winning broadcaster Ernie Harwell, who called Tigers games mostly on the radio from 1960–2002. The press box at Comerica Park is named The Ernie Harwell Media Center in his honor, a statue of him stands near the main gate of the stadium, and his name is on the Tigers Wall of Fame in right field of Comerica Park. Harwell died in May 2010 at the age of 92 and his body was laid in repose at Comerica Park soon after. The Detroit Sports Media Association (DSMA) inaugurated a DSMA Ernie Harwell Lifetime Achievement Award with Harwell as its first recipient.

== See also ==
- List of XM Satellite Radio channels
- List of Sirius Satellite Radio stations
