= WTCM (AM) =

Coordinates: 44°43′18″N 85°42′18.3″W

- Traverse City, Michigan; United States
- Broadcast area: Traverse City-Petoskey
- Frequency: 580 kHz
- Branding: NewsTalk 580

Programming
- Format: News/talk/sports
- Affiliations: Compass Media Networks; Premiere Networks; Westwood One; Michigan IMG Sports Network

Ownership
- Owner: Midwestern Broadcasting Company
- Sister stations: WATZ-FM; WBCM; WCCW; WCCW-FM; WJZQ; WRGZ; WTCM-FM; WZTK

History
- First air date: January 8, 1941
- Former frequencies: 1370 kHz (January 8 – March 29, 1941); 1400 kHz (March 29, 1941–1982)
- Call sign meaning: Traverse City, Michigan

Technical information
- Licensing authority: FCC
- Facility ID: 70524
- Class: B
- Power: 50,000 watts day; 1,100 watts night

Links
- Public license information: Public file; LMS
- Webcast: Listen live
- Website: www.newstalk580.com

WTCM (580 kHz) is an AM radio station broadcasting out of Traverse City, Michigan with a news/talk radio format. It is owned by Midwestern Broadcasting, with its studio on East Front Street in Downtown Traverse City.

WTCM operates at 50,000 watts during the day, the maximum allowed for AM stations. To protect other stations on 580 AM from interference, it must lower power to 1,100 watts at night. The station uses a directional antenna with a four-tower array. The signal covers much of Northern Michigan and the Upper Peninsula during the day. The transmitter is on Secor Road in Long Lake Township, near Long Lake.

== Programming ==
Weekdays on WTCM begin with the Steve Gruber Show, a statewide conservative talk show originating from WJIM in Lansing, Michigan. Two local programs, The Ron Jolly Show and The Vic McCarty Show, air weekday mornings. The rest of the station's lineup consists of syndicated talk shows hosted by Dan Bongino, Sean Hannity, Mark Levin, Dave Ramsey, and Red Eye Radio.

Weekends feature shows on real estate, technology, law, finance and the outdoors. Weekend local shows include Ask the Real Estate Guy, The Big Beer Show, The History Show, and Fun Time Polka Party. Syndicated programs include Outdoor Magazine with Mike Avery, Bill Handel on the Law, The Kim Kommando Show, and The Ben Ferguson Show. Most hours begin with an update from FOX News Radio.

WTCM is also the radio home of the University of Michigan football and is a member of the Michigan IMG Sports Network.

== History ==
=== Founding ===
In 1939, WTCM founder Les Biederman and several of his friends—including engineer Bill Kiker and financier Drew McClay—wanted to start a radio station in an undeveloped market. They decided that Traverse City, Michigan was a city destined for growth and without a local radio station, so Biederman and Kiker moved to the city and built the 250-watt transmitter that would be Traverse City's first radio station.

Traverse City "looked like three main streets with false front stores crowded against each other, all built around 1890 and hardly updated since," according to Les.

WTCM initially broadcast from a small studio at the base of the tower on Morgan ("Radio") Hill, west of town. The WTCM control console was hand built by Biederman and Kiker, and served the station from 1940 until its replacement around 1980.

When WTCM signed on in 1941, it was a local channel station at 1370 kHz. briefly before moving to 1400 kHz on March 29, 1941, due to NARBA. The station was licensed to broadcast 24 hours at 250 watts, but only broadcast from 6 a.m. to 11 p.m. WTCM was an NBC Radio Network affiliate and like most radio stations at the time, aired block programming - some local shows, network shows, music programs, etc.

WTCM soon outgrew the tiny studio and moved to the Anderson Building in the 100 block of downtown Traverse City in the mid-1940s. Long-time Midwestern employees Kenn Haven and Merlin Dumbrille began working there in the 1940s.

Because WTCM had a limited reach, Biederman wanted to start other small stations aimed exclusively towards the towns they broadcast in. After fighting in World War II, Biederman started WATT in Cadillac in 1945; WATZ in Alpena in 1946, WMBN in Petoskey in 1947 and WATC in Gaylord in 1950, all collectively known as the Paul Bunyan Network. All but WATC and WATZ are still on the air today, WATT and WMBN were sold to MacDonald Broadcasting, with Midwestern holding on to WTCM.

=== 1950s and 1960s ===
In 1954, Biederman signed on WPBN-TV (channel 7) in Traverse City as its NBC television affiliate, just months after the Traverse City market got its first TV station, Sparton's CBS/ABC/DuMont WWTV 13 in Cadillac, now known as 9 & 10. In 1959, WPBN increased its reach to WTOM-TV (channel 4) in Cheboygan, bringing NBC shows to the eastern upper peninsula.

Big changes came to WTCM and the rest of the Paul Bunyan Network in the 1960s as the Federal Communications Commission (FCC) allowed local channel stations to increase their daytime power to 1,000 watts. All of the local channel stations complied, and boosted their power.

In 1964, long time WTCM air staffer Merlin Dumbrille started hosting the popular "Farm and Orchard Time" program, a WTCM staple since 1941. He retired as host of the show on October 30, 2009.

Long time Midwestern employee Bill Gravelin also started working for the station in the 1960s and was the "late night" host of Traverse Citys first "top 40" music in the late 1960s and early 1970s. Daytime at WTCM in this period was mostly "middle of the road" or "MOR" music featuring artists such as Frank Sinatra, Mario Lanza and others.

It is a local legend (urban myth?) that the Beatles and other "early rock" was seldom played in the market at this time other than late at night.

=== 1970s ===
WTCM became contemporary (as "14-T") in 1975 under the supervision of long-time Traverse City broadcaster Jerry Meyer who came from WCCW by the hand of General Manager Jack Walkmeyer, and who soon hired Flint talent Jon McRae as the first program director of the fledgling contemporary radio effort.

A difficult but necessary task was moving "old school" morning show host Kenn Haven to a role as news director.

Havens’ now-dated morning news and music show featured bits such as "first call" and "last call" to breakfast, and use of the NBC "Chime" and a hand bell.

McRae lasted but a short time, finding frustration in many aspects of bringing a 1960s MOR station into the 1970s. Meyer soon also departed, to purchase "Murray Boat & Motor" on the Boardman River (then moving it), then become news anchor for WWTV 9&10 news (a position he held for many years), and finally run for a state legislative seat in the 1990s before retiring.

In 1977 former WCCW afternoon host Lin McNett ("Michael O'Shea") replaced McRae and Meyer as WTCM's program director and morning personality.

Many out of town talents were brought to the market in this short (2-3 year) period for the first time in the stations history as it attempted a metamorphosis from "old school" to "modern" in the face of the growing potential FM band competition.

Other air staff during this period included Jon McRae, and "Downtown" Ed Brown from WTAC in Flint, Michigan (Brown is now with "All Access", a national broadcasting trade publication as its contemporary radio editor); Delbert "Tim" Nixon (now with MacDonald-Garber Broadcasting in Petoskey); Don Schuster (who came from Detroit free-form radio legends WWWW/W-4 and WABX and is now back there 40 years later in sales capacities); local talent Marty Spaulding (later with WRKR in Kalamazoo for 10 year hosting an internationally recognized blues format "netcast" in the early days of internet broadcasting); Jon "Patrick" Rekeweg from Am radio in Fort Wayne; Bob Greenwood (from the legendary free-form rock station WHNN in Bay City); Dave "Leighton" Elliott; and Alan "White" Vasquez, a former host of the avant-garde "Pen Ultimate" late night alternative rock show on competitor WCCW) who went on to numerous roles in broadcast programming where he still resides in Colorado..

The contemporary format was initially successful, but the 1977 format change of WJML, and the 1980 entry of WKHQ, both from north of Traverse City but with strong regional signals into the market caused the predictable result, and listeners gravitated over a period of a couple years to the clear, static-free stereo FM contemporary format signals. It was the fading days of AM radio as a competitor just about everywhere.

WTCM became simulcast to the FM signal not long after that.

WTCM-FM became country in the early 1970s, at the urging of WTCM salesman Leon Purchase, a local country musician, who was convinced that a country format would work in rural northern Michigan. Purchase convinced Biederman of this the old fashioned way, by making WTCM-FM - even though automated other than the morning simulcast period - a highly salable and accepted product in the market. Today that opinion is a well proven fact, as WTCM-FM maintains market dominance as the #1 rated station.

Les Biederman was not a fan of contemporary music or even less so country music, preferring to listen to classical music in his "pad", a private office in the rear of the adjacent co-owned Midwestern Cablevision building (where their "Radio Center" complex now stands). The "pad" was a regular stop for notable politicians like Governor William Milliken and Senator Robert Griffin, among others. It was a short stroll for Les from "the pad" to the trunk of his car where he typically stored a case of his favored Velvo brand cigars. "They stay fresh out there in the trunk" he was known to say.

Biederman traditionally came to the WTCM studio (almost nightly) after the conclusion of the TV 7&4 newscast and recorded an editorial on topics of the day, and these editorials and his strong sense of local stewardship culminated (among other things) into a local college (Northwestern Michigan College) and other more abstract realities including the city power plant converting from coal to wood as a source of fuel.

In the late 1970s, Biederman also began ambitious plans to increase the power of both WTCM AM and -FM. In 1978, Biederman started turning over more of his duties to his son, Ross Biederman. Because of FCC restrictions and WTCM's growth plans, several properties were sold, including the Petoskey and Cadillac stations (to MacDonald Broadcasting, founded by long-time Biederman broadcast pal Kenneth MacDonald) and the Gaylord station was sold to William Barr, but fell silent several owners later in the early 2000s due to financial troubles.

=== 1980s ===
In 1980, Les Biederman traded WPBN-TV to US Tobacco for stock, and became its largest individual shareholder.

In 1982, after years of planning, engineering and FCC permitting, a major change was made to WTCM, which had since started simulcasting with WTCM-FM. The station was moved to its current frequency of 580 kHz and boosted power to 2,500 watts daytime. The first overnight DJ was Colleen (Janson) Wares.

The 1400 frequency was donated to a local church, who made the station Traverse City's first religious station, WLJN (We Lift Jesus' Name). WLJN broadcast from the original WTCM studio on Morgan Hill ("Radio Hill" to the locals), at the base of the 1400 kHz tower.

Les Biederman still considered AM radio to be "the" signal and made many long-term plans to make WTCM the dominant signal in the region, leaving implementation to his son, Ross.

Many current-day and long-run WTCM air staffers began association with the stations in this "rebirth" period including Dave Gauthier (who had worked there briefly in the 1970s), Carey Carlson, Ryan Dobry, Ron Jolly, Colleen Wares and Jack O'Malley.

Lin McNett ("Michael O'Shea") returned from other out-of-state broadcast employment for a second and long standing stint.

Les Biederman died in 1986 after enjoying much of his leisure time on his boat "Happy Days".

In the late 1980s, WTCM (and other AMs) were struggling. Although he has Democratic leanings, Ross Biederman decided to start airing Rush Limbaugh's program because he thought it would help ratings, and made the station full-time news/talk.

=== 1990s ===
With FCC restrictions lessening, it created opportunities for the younger Biederman to rebuild the Paul Bunyan Network. In the 1990s, he purchased or erected several stations in other northern markets, and designed them to rebroadcast his Traverse City signals. WBCM 93.5 Boyne City (formerly WCLX) simulcasted WTCM-FM and WKJF 1370 Cadillac eventually simulcasted WCCWM. WKJF has since been donated to the same ministry that received the original 1400 signal, Good News Media (which changed the calls to WLJW in March 2004 and has since used it to simulcast WLJN). Also, in the 1990s, Biederman purchased WCCW 1310 (then standards from ABC's "Stardust" network, now sports from ESPN Radio) and FM 107.5 (oldies), which had been WTCM's primary local competitor in the "early days" after being founded by a former Midwestern employee, John Anderson, in 1960.

Former logo

In 1994, Ron Jolly was hired to host a local morning program between 7-10 am. Jolly was an award-winning newscaster for WTCM AM and -FM between 1986 and 1990. Before returning to WTCM to host the morning show he worked at WJIM Lansing, and WLXT-FM, Petoskey/Traverse City. His program features a blend of news, information and interviews with local and statewide figures from politics, arts & entertainment, education, business, etc. Jolly left the station for ten months in 2001 to join the Michigan Talk Radio Network based in Charlevoix.

=== 2000s ===
On June 1, 2005, WTCM boosted its power once again, this time to a full 50 kW daytime, allowing its directional signal to penetrate Canada. They, however, broadcast with only 1,100 watts overnight. Because AM transmits mostly through groundwave signals, and Northern Michigan's terrain is mostly sand, transmission is difficult, although WTCM's signal footprint is larger than those of other stations due to its low frequency.

In 2008, Norm Jones joined the airstaff hosting a newly created local program between 10am - Noon. Jones has been associated with the station on and off since the early 1980s, and would later be paired up with Bill Froehlich in the afternoons.

=== 2010s ===
In 2010, Merlin Dumbrille, longtime host of the Farm and Orchard Show, retired after fifty plus years at WTCM.

In 2012, Christal Frost joined the morning programming as producer and co-host. Christal has been affiliated with several other Northern Michigan stations since 2006. In 2014 she started hosting her own show from 10am to noon. The show ended in 2022.

In January 2014, WTCM NewsTalk 580 introduced The Afternoon Drive to replace the Sean Hannity slot 3 to 6pm weekdays. Norm Jones and Bill Froehlich hosted the show and focused on a variety of local news topics. Norm Jones died in 2020. Sean Hannity has since returned to the time slot and Bill Froehlich now hosts a show on WWTV in Cadillac.

In December 2016, Red Eye Radio replaced Coast to Coast AM overnights.

=== 2020s ===
WTCM was a Rush Limbaugh affiliate until his death in 2022. His noon to 3pm time slot was briefly filled by Clay Travis and Buck Sexton from Premiere Radio Networks. The station now airs Dan Bongino from Westwood One during this time.

Local media personality Vic McCarty took over the 10am to noon slot in 2022 from Christal Frost. McCarty, who previously worked at competitors WZTC and WMKT, also host of The Big Beer Show. Vic McCarty died in April 2026.

Ron Jolly and longtime producer Colleen Wares announced their retirement on January 16th, 2026, to take effect on April 10th.
