= WTCM-FM =

- Traverse City, Michigan; United States
- Broadcast area: Traverse City Area
- Frequency: 103.5 MHz
- Branding: TCM

Programming
- Format: Country
- Affiliations: Michigan Radio Network

Ownership
- Owner: Midwestern Broadcasting Company
- Sister stations: WATZ-FM; WCCW; WCCW-FM; WJZQ; WRGZ; WTCM; WZTK

History
- First air date: December 13, 1965
- Call sign meaning: Traverse City, Michigan

Technical information
- Licensing authority: FCC
- Facility ID: 70525
- Class: C0
- ERP: 100,000 watts
- HAAT: 302 meters (991 ft)
- Transmitter coordinates: 44.4592°N 85.7014°W

Links
- Public license information: Public file; LMS
- Webcast: Listen live
- Website: www.wtcmi.com

WTCM-FM (103.5 MHz "Today's Country Music") is a commercial radio station in Traverse City, Michigan, serving much of Northern Michigan. It carries a country music format and is owned by Midwestern Broadcasting.

== History ==
In 1939, WTCM founder Les Biederman and several of his friends—engineer Bill Kiker and Drew McClay among others—decided to start a radio station in an undeveloped radio market. They chose Traverse City, Michigan as a city destined for growth which had no local radio station. They moved to the city and built the 250-watt transmitter that would be Traverse City's first radio station. WTCM initially broadcast from a small studio at the base of the tower. The WTCM control console was hand-built by Biederman and Kiker, and served the station until its replacement around 1980.

When WTCM signed on in 1940, it was a local channel station at 1370 kc. briefly before moving to 1400 kc. The station was licensed to broadcast 24 hours at 250 watts, but only broadcast from 6 AM to 11 PM. WTCM was an NBC affiliate and, like most radio stations at the time, aired block programming - some local shows, network shows, music programs, etc.

In the mid-1940s, the studio moved to the Anderson Building in the 100 block of downtown Traverse City. Because WTCM had a limited reach, Biederman wanted to start other small stations aimed exclusively towards the towns they broadcast in. After fighting in World War II, Biederman started WATT in Cadillac in 1945, WATZ in Alpena in 1946, WMBN in Petoskey in 1947 and WATC in Gaylord in 1950, all collectively known as the Paul Bunyan Network. All but WATC are still on the air today, but Midwestern Broadcasting owns only WTCM and WATZ.

In 1954, Biederman signed on NBC WPBN-TV 7 in Traverse City, just months after the Traverse City market got its first TV station, Sparton's CBS/ABC/DuMont WWTV 13 in Cadillac, now known as channels 9 & 10. In 1959, WPBN increased its reach to WTOM 4 in Cheboygan, bringing NBC shows to the eastern upper peninsula.

Big changes came to WTCM and the rest of the Paul Bunyan Network in the 1960s when the Federal Communications Commission (FCC) allowed local channel stations to increase their daytime power to 1,000 watts. All of the local channel stations complied, and boosted their power.

In 1964, long time WTCM air staffer Merlin Dumbrille started hosting the popular Farm and Orchard Time program, a WTCM staple since 1941. He retired as host of the show on October 30, 2009.

WTCM became contemporary (as "14-T") in 1975 under the supervision of long-time Traverse City broadcaster Jerry Meyer. In 1977, former WCCW afternoon host Lin McNett ("Michael O'Shea") became WTCM's program director and morning personality.

The Top 40 format was initially successful, but the 1977 format change of WJML, and the 1980 entry of WKHQ, both from north of Traverse City but with strong regional signals into the market, caused the predictable result, and listeners gravitated over a period of a couple years to the stereo FM contemporary format signals. WTCM became simulcast to the FM signal not long afterward.

WTCM-FM became a country station in the early 1970s, at the urging of WTCM salesman Leon Purchase, a local country musician, who was convinced that a country format would work in rural northern Michigan. In the late 1970s, Biederman began plans to increase the power of both WTCM AM and FM.

In 1978, Biederman started turning over more of his duties to his son, Ross Biederman. Because of FCC restrictions and WTCM's growth plans, several properties were sold, including the Petoskey and Cadillac stations (to MacDonald Broadcasting, founded by long-time Biederman broadcaster Kenneth MacDonald) and the Gaylord station was sold to William Barr, but fell silent several owners later in the early 2000s, due to financial troubles.

In 1980, Biederman traded WPBN-TV to US Tobacco for stock, and became its largest individual shareholder.

In 1982, after years of planning, engineering and FCC permitting, a major change was made to WTCM, which had since started simulcasting with WTCM-FM. The station was moved to its current position at 580 and boosted power to 2,500 watts daytime. The 1400 frequency was donated to a local church, who made the station Traverse City's first religious station, WLJN (We Lift Jesus' Name). WLJN broadcast from the original WTCM studio on Morgan Hill ("Radio Hill" to the locals), at the base of the 1400 kHz tower.

In the 1990s, Ross Biederman purchased or erected several stations in other northern markets, and designed them to rebroadcast the Traverse City signals. First, WTCM-FM added a rebroadcaster in WBCM 93.5 FM Boyne City. The 93.5 frequency began broadcasting in 1978, and originally programmed a stand-alone country format as WCLX (with the calls standing for nearby Charlevoix). (The WBCM calls were used for years at an AM station in Bay City, Michigan, now WMAX.) Later, WKJF 1370 Cadillac simulcast WCCW. WKJF has since been donated to the same ministry that received the original 1400 signal, Good News Media (which changed the calls to WLJW in March 2004, and has since used it to simulcast WLJN). Also, in the 1990s, Biederman purchased WCCW (AM) 1310 (then standards from ABC's "Stardust" network, now sports from ESPN Radio) and FM 107.5 (oldies), which had been WTCM's primary local competitor in the "early days" after being founded by a former Midwestern employee, John Anderson, in 1960.

WTCM boosted its power once again, this time to a full 50 kW daytime, allowing its directional signal to penetrate Canada. The station started broadcasting from its new home, Biederman's Radio Centre building in downtown Traverse City, in 2002. The building also houses Ross Biederman's other properties, WCCW-AM-FM (along with recent sign-on WCZW-FM 107.9 Charlevoix, which simulcasts WCCW-FM "Oldies 107-5") and Top 40 WJZQ 92.9 FM (Z93).

On February 24, 2020, WTCM simulcaster WBCM 93.5 FM dropped its simulcast with WTCM-FM and began simulcasting mainstream rock-formatted WKLT 97.5 FM Kalkaska.

== Previous logo ==
(WTCM's logo under previous simulcast with WBCM 93.5)
