= Michigan Sports Network =

Collegiate sports radio network

Michigan Wolverines Sports Network
- Type: Radio network
- Country: United States
- Headquarters: Ann Arbor, Michigan
- Broadcast area: Michigan; Ohio (limited)
- Owner: Learfield IMG College
- Affiliations: Michigan Wolverines; CBS Radio
- Affiliates: 46 (including 1 flagship)
- Official website: Michigan football affiliates Michigan basketball affiliates

The Michigan Wolverines Sports Network is an American radio network consisting of 46 radio stations which carry coverage of Michigan Wolverines football and men's basketball. WCSX (94.7 FM) and WMGC-FM (105.1 FM), both in Metro Detroit, serve as the network's flagship stations. The network also includes 44 affiliates in the U.S. states of Michigan and Ohio: 27 AM stations, four of which extend their signals with low-power FM translators; and 17 full-power FM stations (WQQO Toledo generally only broadcasts Michigan content over its HD Radio digital subchannel). Games are also available on SiriusXM satellite radio and online via TuneIn.

== Announcers ==
=== Football ===
Doug Karsch does play-by-play and Jon Jansen does color commentary for football.

=== Basketball ===
Brian Boesch currently serves as play-by-play announcer for men's basketball, joined by color analyst Terry Mills.

== History ==
Michigan's relationship with IMG College dates back to March 2001 when the school signed a five-year deal with Host Communications, Inc., a sports marketing firm based in Lexington, Kentucky]; the deal was predicted to generate $7.5 million in advertising revenue from Michigan football and men's basketball radio broadcasts through 2005–06 (this partnership with Host would ultimately remain in place for the next seven years). In 2007, IMG College purchased Host Communications; in August 2008, IMG announced a new 12-year media rights deal with Michigan reportedly worth $86 million, including gameday radio broadcasts.

WJR/Detroit had served as the network flagship station for Michigan football since 1976 (with sister station CKLW serving as backup for those times when Detroit Tigers baseball games took precedence) and men's basketball since 1997. In October 2005, WJR announced a new deal to broadcast rival Michigan State football and men's basketball, while simultaneously dropping its long partnership with Michigan. The news came as a surprise to the Michigan athletic department, including director Bill Martin, who claimed the school had acted "in good faith" throughout months of negotiations with the station. Michigan soon signed a new five-year deal with CBS Radio and CHUM Limited (later CTVglobemedia), owners of WOMC/Detroit and CKLW/Windsor, respectively. In August 2011, new Michigan athletic director Dave Brandon announced a five-year contract extension with CBS Radio, with the majority of network flagship coverage shifting to WOMC's AM sister station WWJ.

Play-by-play announcer Jim Brandstatter and analyst Dan Dierdorf both announced their retirements prior to the commencement of the season-opening Michigan Wolverines Football game on September 4, 2021. The Duo sat side-by-side in the Michigan booth for 7 seasons.

== Station list ==
Callsign	Frequency	Band	City	State	Network status
WCSX	94.7	FM	Birmingham - Detroit	Michigan	Flagship (Football only)
WMGC	105.1	FM	Detroit	Michigan	Flagship
WQBX*	104.9	FM	Alma	Michigan	Network affiliate
WFYC**	1280	AM	Alma	Michigan	Network affiliate
WZTK*	105.7	FM	Alpena	Michigan	Network affiliate
WTKA	1050	AM	Ann Arbor	Michigan	Network affiliate
WWWW-FM	102.9	FM	Ann Arbor	Michigan	Network affiliate
WBXX*	104.9	FM	Battle Creek	Michigan	Network affiliate
WFAT**	930	AM	Battle Creek	Michigan	Network affiliate
W274AQ**	102.7	FM	Battle Creek	Michigan	n/a (simulcasts WFAT)
WSJM-FM*	94.9	FM	Benton Harbor	Michigan	Network affiliate
WQON*	99.3	FM	Beulah	Michigan	n/a (simulcasts WQON)
WKAD	93.7	FM	Cadillac	Michigan	Network affiliate
WKYO**	1360	AM	Caro	Michigan	Network affiliate
WIDL*	92.1	FM	Cass City	Michigan	Network affiliate
WGTO**	910	AM	Cassopolis	Michigan	Network affiliate
W266BS**	101.1	FM	Cassopolis	Michigan	n/a (simulcasts WGTO)
WMKT	1270	AM	Charlevoix	Michigan	Network affiliate
W272CR	102.3	FM	Petoskey	Michigan	n/a (simulcasts WMKT)
WHKW*	1220	AM	Cleveland	Ohio	Network affiliate
WXYT-HD2; WXYT-HD3*	97.1 HD2; 97.1 HD3	FM	Detroit	Michigan	Network affiliate
WDBC	680	AM	Escanaba	Michigan	Network affiliate
WBNZ**	92.3	FM	Frankfort	Michigan	Network affiliate
WOOD	1300	AM	Grand Rapids	Michigan	Network affiliate
WQON	100.3	FM	Grayling	Michigan	Network affiliate
WKHM	970	AM	Jackson	Michigan	Network affiliate
WQLR	1660	AM	Kalamazoo	Michigan	Network affiliate
WQTX	92.1	FM	Lansing	Michigan	Network affiliate
WKZC	94.9	FM	Ludington	Michigan	Network affiliate
WMIM	98.3	FM	Luna Pier	Michigan	Network affiliate
WOOD-FM	106.9	FM	Muskegon	Michigan	Network affiliate
WNBY	1450	AM	Newberry	Michigan	Network affiliate
WNIL**	1290	AM	Niles	Michigan	Network affiliate
WWTH	100.7	FM	Oscoda	Michigan	Network affiliate
WMBN	1340	AM	Petoskey	Michigan	Network affiliate
WHLS*	1450	AM	Port Huron	Michigan	Football only
W288BT*	105.5	FM	St. Clair	Michigan	n/a (simulcasts WHLS)
WPHM**	1380	AM	Port Huron	Michigan	Basketball only
WHAK	980	AM	Rogers City	Michigan	Network affiliate
WHAK-FM	99.9	FM	Rogers City	Michigan	Network affiliate
WSGW**	790	AM	Saginaw	Michigan	Basketball only
WSGW-FM*	100.5	FM	Saginaw	Michigan	Football only
WKNW**	1400	AM	Sault Ste. Marie	Michigan	Network affiliate
WBET	1230	AM	Sturgis	Michigan	Network affiliate
WTCM*	580	AM	Traverse City	Michigan	Network affiliate
WCCW**	1310	AM	Traverse City	Michigan	Network affiliate
WHKZ*	1440	AM	Youngstown	Ohio	Network affiliate

Gray background indicates low-power translator
* football only
** men's basketball only

=== Network map(s) ===
Map of network stations in Michigan	Map of network stations in Ohio
