= WLJW =

WLJW may refer to:

- WLJW (AM), a radio station (1370 AM) licensed to serve Cadillac, Michigan, United States
- WLJW-FM, a radio station (95.9 FM) licensed to serve Fife Lake, Michigan, United States
