= WHAK =

WHAK can refer to:

- WHAK (AM), a radio station at 960 AM located in Rogers City, Michigan which simulcasts WYPV
- WHAK-FM, a radio station at 99.9 FM located in Rogers City, Michigan
