= WLXT =

Radio station in Petoskey, Michigan

Simulcast with WLXV Cadillac
- Petoskey, Michigan; United States
- Broadcast area: Northern Michigan
- Frequency: 96.3 MHz
- Branding: Lite 96.3 & 96.7

Programming
- Format: Adult contemporary

Ownership
- Owner: MacDonald Garber Broadcasting
- Sister stations: WATT, WKAD, WKHQ-FM, WLXV, WMKT, WMBN

History
- First air date: January 7, 1967
- Former call signs: WMBN-FM (1967–1994)
- Former frequencies: 96.7 MHz (1967–1984)
- Call sign meaning: "Lite"

Technical information
- Licensing authority: FCC
- Facility ID: 65926
- Class: C1
- ERP: 100,000 watts
- HAAT: 299 meters (981 ft)
- Transmitter coordinates: 45.321°N 84.876°W

Links
- Public license information: Public file; LMS
- Webcast: Listen live
- Website: www.lite96.com

WLXT (96.3 FM, "Lite 96.3 & 96.7") is an adult contemporary radio station licensed to Petoskey, Michigan, at an ERP of 100,000 watts, covering most of northern Michigan. It is owned by Trish MacDonald-Garber, whose family has owned the station for over 30 years. Between mid-November and December each year, WLXT switches to an all-Christmas music format.

== History ==
The station signed on January 7, 1967, at 96.7, only broadcasting with 3,000 watts and airing beautiful music. The station was originally WMBN-FM, owned by Les Biederman's Midwestern Broadcasting Company of Traverse City, Michigan, and mostly simulcasted WMBN (1340 AM). In the 1970s, Biederman wanted to boost the signals of his Traverse City stations, ordering him to divest most of his other properties due to Federal Communications Commission (FCC) rules and regulations. He sold WMBN-AM/FM to Kenneth MacDonald of MacDonald Broadcasting, a friend of his who owned stations in Saginaw and later Lansing. MacDonald had a cottage in the Petoskey area, and accepted the offer to purchase WMBN.

MacDonald trained his children, Andy, Ken, Jr. (aka "Mac") and Patricia ("Trish") to run successful stations like he did, and put young 20-something Trish in charge of WMBN. Under her rule, WMBN changed its call sign to WWPZ and flipped to an early version of the adult hits Jack FM format. WWPZ played everything from oldies to classic rock, funk to Top 40 hits, mostly with Dennis Martin (Corpe) programming the station. They also aired The Larry King Show at night. WMBN-FM, however, remained beautiful music, using the slogan "Michigan's Beautiful North". WPZ also aired sports, like Tigers baseball.

It was also around that time that WMBN-FM moved from 96.7 to 96.3 and boosted its power to 100 kW. WMBN-FM remained beautiful music throughout most of the 1980s, and got strong adults numbers in the Northwest Michigan ratings. The station was automated most of the time, including a voicetracked night shift from owner Ken MacDonald himself. Sadly, Ken passed in 1989, and for a while, the station still aired his taped show. Jim Scollin did a live morning drive show for many years in the 1980s.

=== Lite 96 FM ===
In 1990, Trish decided to flip WMBN-FM from beautiful music to Soft AC. The station's music became more contemporary, and aimed for a slightly younger audience. Meanwhile, the easy listening music found a new home on the AM dial at WMBN (AM), which would move to Westwood One's "AM Only" format of adult standards (now known as America's Best Music and syndicated by Dial Global).

In the mid-1990s, Trish purchased WWLZ 96.7 in Cadillac, Michigan, changing the station from CHR to a simulcast of WMBN-FM, which changed its call letters to WLXT to match its Lite 96 name. 96.7 became WLXV.

In 2002, the WLXT/WLXV simulcast ended when Trish decided that Cadillac, a town with six stations and five of them being simulcasts of other stations (and the one that was not, WATT, being mainly syndicated talk), needed a music station to call its own. She flipped WLXV to a hot AC format as Mix 96. (In early 2003, WLXV gained a sister station also solely serving the Cadillac market in WKAD-FM "Oldies 93.7", airing a syndicated 1960s/1970s oldies format from Jones Radio Networks - this format is now part of Dial Global's Kool Gold network.) After Christmas 2010, WLXV got competition in the form of Jennifer Theodore's 107.9 WCDY, giving Cadillac two hot AC stations.

=== WLXT today ===
Today, Lite 96 is the AC ratings leader in northern Michigan even though they have lost some audience to other stations such as former smooth jazz station WJZQ and former AC WSRT. WLXT is also the northern Michigan affiliate for the John Tesh Radio Show. The station aired Delilah's love-song dedication program at night for a short time after WSRT, northern Michigan's former Delilah affiliate, dropped its AC format for talk. WLXT also airs American Top 40: The '80s and the 1980s and 1990s editions of Backtrax USA during the weekends.

Like many other AC stations across the country, WLXT flips to continuous Christmas music during the holiday season.

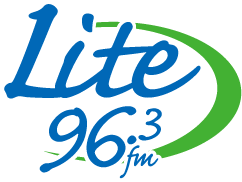
Logo before simulcasting WLXV again

In the fall of 2007 the station adjusted its on-air branding from "Lite 96" to "Lite 96.3", possibly due to competitor Northern Radio flipping its Petoskey-area translator station at 95.3 to a simulcast of AC competitor WSRT. In May 2010, WSRT dropped its AC format and switched to a talk radio format, leaving WLXT as the only AC station in the market.

On November 7, 2025, WLXT began being simulcast on WLXV 96.7 FM Cadillac, reuniting a past simulcast connection between the two stations.
