= WATZ (AM) =

Radio station in Alpena, Michigan (1946–2014)

Alpena, Michigan; United States
- Frequency: 1450 kHz
- Branding: NewsTalk AM 1450

Programming
- Format: Defunct (formerly News-Talk)

Ownership
- Owner: Midwestern Broadcasting Company; (WATZ Radio, Inc.)
- Sister stations: WATZ-FM, WBCM, WCCW, WCCW-FM, WLJD, WJZQ, WRGZ, WTCM, WTCM-FM

History
- First air date: November 1946
- Last air date: June 24, 2014

Technical information
- Facility ID: 71109
- Class: C
- Power: 1,000 watts
- Transmitter coordinates: 45°03′58″N 83°29′06″W

WATZ (1450 AM, "WATZ AM 1450") was a radio station broadcasting a News-Talk format. The station was licensed to the city of Alpena, Michigan, serving the Alpena area. It first began broadcasting in 1946 and maintained the WATZ call sign since it signed on. The station was owned by Midwestern Broadcasting Company.

== History ==
WATZ signed on the air in November, 1946 as a full-service local radio station and was, for many years, the only broadcaster in Alpena. In the late 1960s, WATZ-FM signed on as an adult contemporary station at 93.5 FM. By this time, the format of WATZ was primarily country. In 1988, the format of WATZ-FM was changed to country and the signal moved to 99.3 so the station could boost its power from 3,000 to 50,000 watts. For the next several years, WATZ-FM and WATZ simulcasted the same programming. In the mid-'90s, WATZ was broken off from WATZ-FM and given its news/talk format.

WATZ remained locally owned and operated by the same company that founded it in 1946.

On Tuesday, June 24, 2014 the engineers shut off the WATZ AM 1450 radio transmitter.

Midwestern Broadcasting surrendered WATZ's license to the Federal Communications Commission (FCC) on July 7, 2014; the FCC cancelled the license the same day. WATZ's format and programming were moved to Midwestern Broadcasting's newly licensed WZTK.
