= WATZ =

WATZ may refer to:

- WATZ-FM, a radio station (99.3 FM) licensed to serve Alpena, Michigan, United States
- WATZ (AM), a defunct radio station (1450 AM) formerly licensed to serve Alpena, Michigan
