= WCCW-FM =

Radio station in Traverse City, Michigan

Coordinates: 44.767°N 85.691°W

- Traverse City, Michigan; United States
- Frequency: 107.5 MHz
- Branding: Good Vibes 107.5

Programming
- Format: Classic hits
- Affiliations: Michigan Radio Network

Ownership
- Owner: Midwestern Broadcasting Company
- Sister stations: WATZ-FM, WBCM, WCCW, WJZQ, WRGZ, WTCM, WTCM-FM, WZTK

History
- First air date: November 1, 1967
- Former call signs: WCCW-FM (1967–10/11/82); WMZK (10/11/82–12/2/85)
- Call sign meaning: Cherry Capital of the World

Technical information
- Licensing authority: FCC
- Facility ID: 20423
- Class: C2
- ERP: 50,000 watts
- HAAT: 150 meters (490 ft)

Links
- Public license information: Public file; LMS
- Webcast: Listen live
- Website: wccw.fm

WCCW-FM (107.5 MHz) is an FM radio station in Traverse City, Michigan, United States. The station is owned by the Midwestern Broadcasting group, which to this day includes the family members of its original partners from the early 1940s, the Biedermans, Kikers and McClays.

Midwestern, parent company of WTCM and WTCM-FM, acquired its long-time "local competitor" WCCW in 1996.

== History ==
=== Early years ===
WCCW (AM), whose call letters stand for "Cherry Capitol of the World", signed on in 1960 under the ownership of John Anderson, a former Midwestern employee who ventured out on his own with contemporary ideas and skills learned working for Midwestern as a salesman in the 1950s.

On November 1, 1967, WCCW added an FM sister at 92.1, which broadcast with 6,000 watts. It was Traverse City's first late night broadcast signal, as both WTCM and WLDR-FM signed off at 11 p.m. This FM originally had an automated beautiful music format.

In the beginning, WCCW was an MOR-formatted station, but added Top 40 afternoon programming in the late 1960s to appeal to the younger crowd. It was Northwest Michigan's first truly contemporary format, even though in later-dayparts, and was soon followed by WVOY in Charlevoix about 1974.

For most of the 1970s, the WCCW air staff was:

- Les Foerster – Morning
- Michael Bradford – Mid-days
- Michael O'Shea – Afternoons
- Phill Orth – Evenings
- Carolyn Beaudette – Overnights

Jerry Meyer and Bob Burian were both involved in management along with owner John Anderson. Meyer later became operations manager at WTCM in 1976 and went on to co-own Murrays Boats & Motors, was the longtime news anchor for TV 9 & 10, and made a run for state representative.

LD Greilick and Michael Bradford were the stations engineers. Bradford went on to establish WBNZ in Frankfort.

"Radio Double C" also had Northern Michigan's earliest avant-garde modern rock programming late at night with the "Pen Ultimate" radio show hosted by Al Vasquez ("Alan White") and Carolyn Beaudette, and was the home of Traverse City's first "real" production agency for radio commercials.

=== Change to Oldies ===
In the 1980s WCCW felt pressure from regional broadcasters WJML-AM-FM and later WKHQ, and became an Adult Contemporary station (as WMZK) rather that competing for the Contemporary Hit radio audience. It later changed to "oldies" and returned to the WCCW moniker.

Other broadcasters associated with WCCW in and after its hey-day were Lucien Jaye ("The Boogie Man"), Dave Elliot (later with WTCM 14-T) Dave Walker (who later became the longtime news anchor at TV 7&4), Steve Cook (Production Director for WTCM), and Ron Jolly (mornings on WTCM) and Jim Moriarty.

Anderson, who still lives to this day, sold WCCW Radio to the Fabiano Brothers of Mt. Pleasant, a well-known beer distributor. In 1991, WCCW-FM moved to 107.5, increasing their power to 50,000 watts. They had to convince Cherry Capital Airport to move their frequencies off that area of the band so they could move there.

=== Midwestern ownership ===
WCCW logo as "Oldies 107.5"

In 1996, the Fabianos sold WCCW Radio to Ross Biederman for $3 million, who made drastic improvements to the stations. He moved the stations out of the old Michigan Theatre building on Front St. to a Today Show-esque window studio next in the former Midwestern Cablevision building next door to WTCM. He also bought the FM station a new TM Century music collection disc set, ending the station's relationship with vinyl and tape carts.

One criticism Biederman received since buying WCCW was that the station, once live and local 24/7, started using ABC's "OldiesRadio" (formerly "Pure Gold") feed for overnights and weekends. The station's overnight DJ, Shawn Michaels, died of a drunk driving crash shortly before the conversion to overnight satellite, though it is unknown if his firing from the station had anything to do with it.

WCCW-FM now once again has live and local personalities during much of the day on Saturday and Sunday, although it continues to air Citadel Media's "Greatest Mojo" programming ABC overnights and during some non-critical weekend dayparts. In 2004, WCCW-FM added a new sister station, 6 kW WCZW 107.9 in Charlevoix, which brings WCCW's programming also to the Petoskey area.

=== WCCW today ===
WCCW-FM in recent years has added more 1980s and early 1990s music to their playlist from artists such as Huey Lewis & The News, Madonna, Whitney Houston, and John Mellencamp, angering traditional oldies fans. The station also more recently switched from its longtime Oldies 107-5 name to Classic Hits 107-5. Nonetheless, the ratings are still excellent, led by a popular airstaff, which includes morning man Charlie DiStefano, aka "Charlie D.", middayer Dave Gauthier, afternoon man Dean Berry.

Dean Berry's been a fixture in northern Michigan radio since the 1980s including a couple of stints on the rock station WKLT. Ron Pritchard spent 10 years as the Program Director and Afternoon Driver at WKHQ, 15 years as Program Director and morning show host on WJZQ, and once hosted weekend talk shows on the Michigan Talk Network. WCCW-FM is also the Traverse City home of the Classic Countdown with Dick Bartley, heard on weekends.

From 2003 to 2015, WCCW-FM operated a simulcast station, WCZW in Charlevoix, Michigan, serving the Petoskey/Charlevoix area at 107.9 FM. In December 2015, WCZW was purchased by Good News Media, and has since changed to a simulcast of the new owners' Christian-formatted WLJN-FM 89.9 as WLJD.

On January 4, 2026, WCCW-FM relaunched its classic hits format as "Good Vibes 107.5".
