= WBRN =

WBRN may refer to:

- WBRN (AM), a radio station (1460 AM) licensed to serve Big Rapids, Michigan, United States
- WKVZ, a radio station (98.7 FM) licensed to serve Holmes Beach, Florida, United States, which held the call sign WBRN-FM from 2015 to 2017
