= KAMN =

KAMN may refer to:

- Gratiot Community Airport (ICAO code KAMN)
- KAMN-LP, a defunct low-power television station (channel 61) formerly licensed to Wailuku, Hawaii, United States
- KAMN (FM), a radio station (98.1 FM) in Iliamna, Alaska
