= WMTR =

WMTR may refer to:

- WMTR (AM), a radio station (1250 AM) licensed to Morristown, New Jersey, United States
- WMTR-FM, a radio station (96.1 FM) licensed to Archbold, Ohio, United States
