= Rich Fisher =

Rich Fisher may refer to:

- Rich Fisher, a figure connected with the Fisher King in Arthurian legend
- Rich Fisher (news anchor) (1949–2017), American television presenter
