= WQAC =

- Alma, Michigan; United States
- Broadcast area: Alma, Michigan
- Frequency: 90.9 MHz
- Branding: "The Duck"

Programming
- Format: Defunct (formerly Modern Rock/Variety; College student station)

Ownership
- Owner: Alma College

History
- First air date: March 27, 1993
- Last air date: February 12, 2018 (date of license surrender)
- Call sign meaning: Alma College and Quack (referencing station branding)

Technical information
- Licensing authority: FCC
- Class: A
- ERP: 100 watts
- Transmitter coordinates: 43.3795°N 84.6736°W

Links
- Public license information: Public file; LMS

WQAC (90.9 FM; "The Duck") was a campus radio station located in Alma, Michigan and operated by Alma College. The station primarily played the music of up-and-coming modern rock bands. WQAC also had a large collection of evening student specialty shows. Over its history, these shows covered everything from world music to classic rock to talk shows.

The station signed on March 27, 1993. In 2016, Alma College announced that WQAC would go silent; it would be replaced by "Pirate Media", a digital media service that incorporates photography and video in addition to radio programming. The WQAC license was surrendered on February 12, 2018, and cancelled by the Federal Communications Commission on February 22, 2018.
