= Rich Fisher (news anchor) =

Detroit news anchor

- Born: March 31, 1949; Detroit, Michigan, U.S.
- Died: March 24, 2017 (aged 67); Royal Oak, Michigan, U.S.
- Occupations: Newscasting, Television presenter
- Known for: Television Presenter Radio Broadcaster
- Television: WATZ (AM) and WATZ-FM 1968-1973 WJRT 1973-1978; WXYZ 1978-1990; WJBK 1990-1997; WKBD & WWJ-TV 1999-2002 WCAR 2011-2012
- Awards: American Bar Association National Award - 1986; Emmy for Broadcasting

Richard Fisher (March 31, 1949 – March 24, 2017), best known as Rich Fisher, was an American television presenter, radio broadcaster, a news anchor and an investigative reporter. He won the National Award from the American Bar Association in 1986, according to WJBK-TV. In 1993, won the Michigan Associated Press Award. He won an Emmy for broadcasting.

== Early life ==
He was born in Detroit, Michigan, 1949. He died in 2017 of esophageal cancer, one week before his 68th birthday.

== Career ==
He began in radio during 1968 on WATZ (both AM and FM). In 1973 he switched to television on WJRT. In 1978 he switched stations to WXYZ, then in 1990 to WJBK. He took a short sabbatical in 1997 to spend time with his family, then in 1999 began working for WKBD & WWJ-TV (co-broadcasting sister stations). By 2011 he was back to radio, broadcasting for WCAR.
