= WZTK =

Radio station in Alpena, Michigan

- Alpena, Michigan; United States
- Frequency: 105.7 MHz
- Branding: 105.7 The Bird

Programming
- Format: Oldies
- Affiliations: Michigan IMG Sports Network; Michigan Radio Network

Ownership
- Owner: Midwestern Broadcasting Company; (WATZ Radio, Inc.)
- Sister stations: WATZ-FM, WBCM, WCCW, WCCW-FM, WJZQ, WRGZ, WTCM, WTCM-FM

History
- First air date: June 2014

Technical information
- Licensing authority: FCC
- Facility ID: 190373
- Class: A
- Power: 4,500 watts
- Transmitter coordinates: 45°03′58″N 83°29′06″W

Links
- Public license information: Public file; LMS
- Webcast: Listen live
- Website: 1057thebird.com

WZTK (105.7 FM) is an American radio station airing an oldies format. The station is licensed to the city of Alpena, Michigan. The station is currently owned by Midwestern Broadcasting Company. On January 2, 2023, the station became "105.7 The Bird... Good Time Oldies".

== History ==
WZTK was issued its broadcast license by the Federal Communications Commission (FCC) on July 30, 2014. WZTK signed on the air at 105.7 FM on June 26, 2014. The station assumed the talk radio format and programming that formerly aired on WATZ, whose license was surrendered to the FCC on July 7, 2014. WZTK is locally owned and operated by the same company that founded WATZ in 1946.

On November 18, 2022, it was announced that WZTK would drop the conservative talk format and begin stunting with Christmas music on November 24. By December 22, the station began airing promos and sweepers promoting the launch of a music-based format on January 2, 2023. On December 30, 2022, it was announced that the new format would be oldies, to be branded as "105.7 The Bird", which launched on January 2, 2023.

== See also ==
- WATZ (AM)
