= WKLT =

Coordinates: 44.791°N 85.239°W

- Kalkaska, Michigan; United States
- Broadcast area: Traverse City, Michigan
- Frequency: 97.5 MHz
- Branding: 97.5 KLT

Programming
- Format: Mainstream rock

Ownership
- Owner: Midwestern Broadcasting Company; (WBCM Radio, Inc.)
- Sister stations: WATZ-FM, WCCW, WCCW-FM, WJZQ, WTCM, WTCM-FM, WZTK

History
- First air date: April 8, 1979
- Former call signs: WKLT (1979–1989); WKLT-FM (1989–1991)
- Former frequencies: 97.7 MHz (1979–1991)
- Call sign meaning: Welcome to KaLkaska and Traverse City

Technical information
- Licensing authority: FCC
- Facility ID: 49591
- Class: C2
- ERP: 32,000 watts
- HAAT: 188 meters (617 ft)

Links
- Public license information: Public file; LMS
- Webcast: Listen live
- Website: wklt.com

WBCM
- Boyne City, Michigan; United States
- Broadcast area: Petoskey, Michigan
- Frequency: 93.5 MHz

Ownership
- Owner: Midwestern Broadcasting Company

History
- First air date: 1978
- Former call signs: WCLX (1978–1991)
- Call sign meaning: Boyne City Michigan

Technical information
- Facility ID: 71210
- Class: C2
- ERP: 14,000 watts
- HAAT: 283 meters (928 ft)

WRGZ
- Rogers City, Michigan; United States
- Broadcast area: Alpena, Michigan
- Frequency: 96.7 MHz

Ownership
- Owner: Midwestern Broadcasting Company

History
- First air date: 1983
- Former call signs: WOEA (1983–1984); WNSR (1984); WMLQ (1984–1988); WVXA (1988–2006)
- Call sign meaning: "Rogers" (Z for S) City

Technical information
- Facility ID: 49304
- Class: C2
- ERP: 42,000 watts
- HAAT: 162 meters (531 ft)

WKLT 97.5 Kalkaska (Traverse City), WBCM 93.5 Boyne City (Petoskey) and WRGZ 96.7 Rogers City (Alpena) are classic rock-leaning mainstream rock stations simulcasting as "KLT The Rock Station". The stations serve Northern Michigan from Traverse City to Alpena.

== History ==
The station was started by Roy Henderson in April 1979 at 97.7, in Kalkaska, Michigan, playing a CHR/Top 40 format as "Kilt 98". Due to its limited signal, the station found it difficult to compete with the high-powered WJML-FM and WKHQ, and so in 1981 the station changed format to automated country as "Country 98".

The station added an AM station at 1420 in 1982, which simulcasted the FM's format. The AM station, WKLT, was a 500-watt daytimer.

In 1982, WKLT became the Grand Traverse region's first AOR station, when Roy Henderson moved to Texas full-time, selling WKLT to a Pepsi-Cola distribution company based in North Dakota. The new AOR format was the first of its kind in northern Michigan and gave listeners an alternative to the Top 40 fare played on WJML and WKHQ. It was during this period that WKLT would be known to its listeners as "98 Rock".

In 1991, WKLT moved to 97.5, boosting power to 32,000 watts and the company purchased WJML in Petoskey (which by that time had shifted to an adult contemporary format in response to competition from WKHQ and WKPK). The company spun off WJML/1110 to local broadcaster Rick Stone (who eventually sold the station to John Yob) and WKLT to the Kalkaska School system, which has since shut the station down for good. WJML-FM 98.9 became WKLZ and Double Rock KLT was born. During the 29 years the stations simulcast, they could be heard as far north as Sault Ste Marie, Ontario, Canada, as far west as Manistique, and as far south as Lake City.

Throughout the 1990s, the station, and Northern Broadcast, were managed by Richard Dills of Grand Rapids. Dills, former General Manager of WKLQ-FM modeled WKLT after WKLQ even going so far as to copy the KLQ logo for KLT. In 2005, Charlie Ferguson took over the GM position at Northern Broadcast after a long stint in Minot, North Dakota, Northern Radio's home city. The Double Rock slogan was changed to "The Rock Station" reflecting the long history of the station. With the change, listeners have noted that the station has become more heavily gold-based than before but that they still plays some currents as well.

Mid-day personality and Program Director Terri Ray has become a Northern Michigan icon. She came to KLT in January 1984. She hosts the highly rated noon time request show "Lunch at the Leetsville Cafe" for 3 plus decades. Terri Ray is also the host of a local music feature called "KLT's Garage" that airs on Sunday nights at 9.

In August 2008, a construction permit was granted for FM translator W281AY 104.1 Alpena.

On February 24, 2020, WKLT switched simulcasters from WKLZ-FM (sold to Educational Media Foundation, eventually switching to EMF's Air1 contemporary Christian format) to WBCM 93.5 FM Boyne City (switched from a simulcast with country-formatted WTCM 103.5 FM Traverse City). This coincided with the station being acquired by Midwestern Broadcasting Company. In April 2020, sister station WRGZ began simulcasting WKLT's classic rock format after 13 years of simulcasting WATZ's country format.

== Previous logo ==
(WKLT's logo under previous simulcast with WKLZ 98.9)
