= WKAD =

Coordinates: 44.278°N 85.591°W

- Harrietta, Michigan; United States
- Broadcast area: Cadillac, Michigan
- Frequency: 93.7 MHz
- Branding: The Ticket 93.7 FM

Programming
- Format: Sports
- Affiliations: Fox Sports Radio; Michigan IMG Sports Network

Ownership
- Owner: MacDonald Garber Broadcasting
- Sister stations: WATT, WKHQ-FM, WLXT, WLXV, WMKT, WMBN

History
- First air date: January 2003
- Call sign meaning: KADillac

Technical information
- Licensing authority: FCC
- Facility ID: 87890
- Class: A
- ERP: 4,300 watts
- HAAT: 119 meters (390 ft)

Links
- Public license information: Public file; LMS
- Website: www.theticketnorthernmichigan.com

WKAD (93.7 FM) is a radio station broadcasting a sports format. Licensed to Harrietta, Michigan, and serving the Cadillac market, it first began broadcasting in 2003. WKAD features programming from Fox Sports Radio. WKAD carries the Detroit Tigers, Detroit Red Wings, Michigan Wolverines Football and Basketball, and Cadillac Viking Sports.

== History ==
On January 2, 2012 WKAD changed formats from oldies to sports, branded as "The Ticket".

== Sources ==
- Michiguide.com - WKAD History
