= WYBR =

Coordinates: 43.684°N 85.582°W

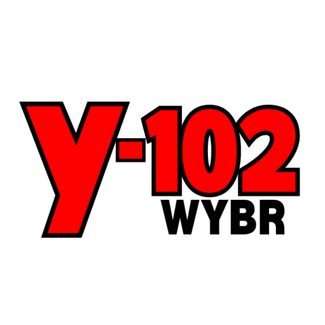
- Big Rapids, Michigan; United States
- Frequency: 102.3 MHz
- Branding: Y102

Programming
- Format: Hot adult contemporary
- Affiliations: Premiere Networks; United Stations Radio Networks

Ownership
- Owner: Mentor Partners, Inc.
- Sister stations: WBRN; WWBR; WWRW

History
- First air date: 1981
- Former call signs: WAAQ (1981–10/29/92); WPZX (10/29/92-10/3/94)
- Call sign meaning: Y Big Rapids

Technical information
- Licensing authority: FCC
- Facility ID: 71629
- Class: C3
- ERP: 10,500 watts
- HAAT: 133 meters (436 ft)

Links
- Public license information: Public file; LMS
- Webcast: Listen Live
- Website: wybr.com

WYBR (102.3 FM, "Y102") is a radio station in Big Rapids, Michigan, broadcasting a hot adult contemporary format. Its signal can be heard as far south as Rockford, Michigan, as far north as Cadillac, Michigan and as far east as Mount Pleasant, Michigan.

The station began broadcasting in 1981 as WAAQ, "The Music Machine, Q102", with an adult contemporary format. In 1992 WAAQ was sold and became WPZX, a CHR/Top 40 station known as "Power 102". In 1994, the station was sold again and WPZX became "Y102", originally employing a Hot AC format from ABC Radio Networks known as "The Best Hits, The Best Variety" (now "Today's Hit Music"). The station dropped the ABC satellite format in 2000 and continues as a Hot AC station to this day.

Specialty programming includes "The Morning Rush with Airon" weekdays 6am-10am, "The Retro Lunch Hour" weekdays at noon, "The Commercial Free Drive at Five" weekdays at 5 p.m and The Zach Sang Show weekday nights. Weekend specialty shows include both the 1980s and 1990s versions of Back Trax USA with Kid Kelly, the Hot AC version of Rick Dees' Weekly Top 40, Saturday and Sunday nights feature The Open House Party with Kannon, and SonRise (contemporary Christian music) on Sunday mornings.
