= WIDL =

- Cass City, Michigan; United States
- Broadcast area: Coverage
- Frequency: 92.1 MHz
- Branding: Classic Rock 92.1 WIDL

Programming
- Format: Classic rock
- Affiliations: Michigan IMG Sports Network; Michigan Radio Network

Ownership
- Owner: Edwards Group Holdings, Inc., Employee Stock Ownership Trust; (Edwards Communications LC)
- Sister stations: WHAK-FM, WHSB, WKYO, WWTH

History
- First air date: 1974
- Former call signs: WIDL (1974–November 29, 1982); WKYO-FM (Nov. 29, 1982 – Aug. 24, 1985)

Technical information
- Licensing authority: FCC
- Facility ID: 29678
- Class: C3
- ERP: 25,000 watts
- HAAT: 97 meters (318 ft)
- Transmitter coordinates: 43°36′54.9″N 83°4′42.5″W

Links
- Public license information: Public file; LMS
- Webcast: Listen live
- Website: www.classicrocki92.com

WIDL (92.1 FM, "I92") is a radio station broadcasting a classic rock format. Licensed to Cass City, Michigan, it first began broadcasting on 104.9 MHz licensed to Caro, Michigan, and still maintains offices and studios in Caro with sister station WKYO. Overall, the station specializes in providing locally focused content such as regional news, weather and sports programming. It is owned by the Edwards Group Holdings, Inc., Employee Stock Ownership Trust, through licensee Edwards Communications LC, which also owns The Tuscola County Advertiser newspaper.

In late 2006, WIDL flipped formats from a variety hits format to a locally programmed Hot AC format which positioned itself as "The Best Mix of The 80's 90's and Now" (sic). Past formats have included easy listening, adult contemporary, classic rock and oldies.

WIDL’s previous logo

On February 3, 2017, WIDL changed its format from hot adult contemporary to classic rock, branded as "I92".

In late 2024, WIDL rebranded as "Classic Rock 92.1 WIDL," dropping the "I92" branding and locally programmed music mix. Current programming includes the syndicated Dave and Mahoney in mornings, local hosts Landyn Schott in middays and Ian Taylor in afternoons, and Local Radio Networks' Classic Rock format at night and on the weekends. Local coverage of high school sports is offered in the fall and winter months; Scott Bolsby and Landyn Schott are the primary announcing team; Bolsby also serves as sports editor of sister newspaper the Tuscola County Advertiser.
