= WZTC =

- Traverse City, Michigan; United States
- Broadcast area: Traverse City, Michigan
- Frequency: 104.5 MHz
- Branding: 104.5 Bob FM

Programming
- Language: English
- Format: Adult hits

Ownership
- Owner: MacDonald Garber Broadcasting; (Playtime Media, LLC)
- Sister stations: WKHQ-FM, WLXV, WMKT, WMBN

History
- First air date: 2011
- Call sign meaning: Traverse City

Technical information
- Licensing authority: FCC
- Facility ID: 65931
- Class: A
- ERP: 1,750 watts
- HAAT: 187 meters (614 ft)
- Transmitter coordinates: 44°46′36″N 85°41′02″W

Links
- Public license information: Public file; LMS
- Webcast: Listen Live
- Website: 1045bobfm.com

WZTC (104.5 FM, "104.5 Bob FM") is an American radio station licensed to serve the community of Traverse City, Michigan. The station, established in 2011, is owned by MacDonald Garber Broadcasting and the broadcast license is held by Playtime Media, LLC.

== Programming ==
WZTC broadcasts an adult hits music format.

== History ==
In October 1994, the MacDonald Broadcasting Company applied to the Federal Communications Commission (FCC) for a construction permit for a new broadcast radio station. After this and several other applications were "frozen" while the FCC determined how to allocate these permits, an auction was finally held in July 2010 in which MacDonald Broadcasting prevailed. The FCC granted this permit on February 7, 2011, with a scheduled expiration date of February 7, 2014. The new station was assigned call sign "WZTC" on March 16, 2011. After construction and testing were completed in August 2011, the station was granted its broadcast license on September 30, 2011.

In July 2011, the MacDonald Broadcasting Company reached an agreement to transfer the permit for still-under construction WZTC to Patricia MacDonald Garber's Playtime Media, LLC, for a token payment of $1. The FCC approved the transfer on September 27, 2011, and the transaction was consummated on October 1, 2011.
