= WFYC =

- Alma, Michigan; United States
- Broadcast area: (Daytime) (Nighttime)
- Frequency: 1280 kHz
- Branding: Fox Sports

Programming
- Format: Sports radio

Ownership
- Owner: Jacom, Inc.
- Sister stations: WQBX

Technical information
- Licensing authority: FCC
- Facility ID: 60786
- Class: D
- Power: 1,000 watts (Daytime); 56 watts (Nighttime)
- Transmitter coordinates: 43°22′08″N 84°36′19″W

Links
- Public license information: Public file; LMS
- Website: www.wqbx.biz/wfyc-1280-am.html

WFYC (1280 AM) is a radio station licensed to Alma, Michigan, United States, broadcasting a mainstream country music format. Prior to mid-2016, the station carried a sports radio format from ESPN Radio and the Michigan IMG Sports Network.

== Sources ==
- Michiguide.com - WFYC History
