= WHSB =

Radio station in Alpena, Michigan

Coordinates: 45.063°N 83.716°W

- Alpena, Michigan; United States
- Broadcast area
- Frequency: 107.7 MHz
- Branding: 107.7 The Bay

Programming
- Format: Top 40 (CHR)
- Affiliations: Westwood One

Ownership
- Owner: Edwards Group Holdings, Inc., Employee Stock Ownership Trust; (Edwards Communications LC)
- Sister stations: WHAK-FM, WIDL, WKYO, WWTH

History
- First air date: 1964
- Call sign meaning: Huron Shore Broadcasters (original owner, 1964)

Technical information
- Licensing authority: FCC
- Facility ID: 15509
- Class: C1
- ERP: 100,000 watts
- HAAT: 186 meters

Links
- Public license information: Public file; LMS
- Webcast: Listen live
- Website: truenorthradionetwork.com

WHSB (107.7 FM, "107.7 The Bay") is a 100,000-watt radio station licensed to Alpena, Michigan broadcasting a Top 40 (CHR) format. The station, which began broadcasting in 1964, has featured some type of contemporary music format since at least the early 1970s, and is currently the only radio station in northeastern Michigan playing currently charted pop music.

== History ==
In the 1980s, the station went by the names "WhisBee", "Music 108" and "HSB, The Music Station." In the early 1990s, the station adopted the moniker "Bay 108" (a reference to nearby Thunder Bay) and affiliated with "Best Hits, Best Variety", a satellite Hot AC format from ABC Radio. In 1999, WHSB dropped ABC's format in favor of Jones' package and tweaked its identifying moniker from "Bay 108" to the current "107-7 The Bay."

On October 23, 2004, Kerwin Kitzman, a longtime popular WHSB disc jockey, sports play-by-play announcer and sales representative, died suddenly of a heart attack at the age of 46. A tribute album to Kitzman, Teddy Bear Memories, was recorded at the Spyder Byte recording studio in Alpena, and a memorial fund, the K2 Kids fund, has been set up in his name.

In the fall of 2004, the station was sold to Edwards Communications. Past owners have included Huron Shore Broadcasters (the original owners when the station went on the air in the 1960s), WHSB Inc., Daraka Broadcasting, and Northern Radio Network Corporation (from whom Edwards acquired the station along with sister stations WHAK-AM/FM Rogers City and then-WCLS Oscoda in 2004).

107-7 The Bay currently features local personalities from 6 a.m. to 7 p.m. The station's local personalities include longtime morning host Darrel Kelly, midday host Max. After Darrel’s retirement in 2022, Max took the helm on the morning show, with newcomer Roo taking the reins in the afternoon. Special weekend programming on Sundays include American Top 40 with Ryan Seacrest. WHSB aired the original version of AT40 with Casey Kasem in years past starting in 1979. All other programming comes from Westwood One's Hot AC format.

WHSB is also the radio home of Alpena High School (the Wildcats) football and hockey.
