= WQBX =

Coordinates: 43.369°N 84.605°W

- Alma, Michigan; United States
- Broadcast area
- Frequency: 104.9 MHz
- Branding: WQBX 104.9

Programming
- Format: Hot adult contemporary
- Affiliations: Waitt Radio Networks "AC Active" format Michigan Wolverines; Detroit Tigers

Ownership
- Owner: Jacom, Inc.
- Sister stations: WFYC

History
- First air date: November 1964 (as WFYC-FM)
- Former call signs: WFYC-FM (1964-11/20/95)

Technical information
- Licensing authority: FCC
- Facility ID: 60788
- Class: A
- ERP: 6,000 watts
- HAAT: 100 meters (330 ft)

Links
- Public license information: Public file; LMS
- Website: https://1049wqbx.com

WQBX (104.9 FM) is a radio station licensed to Alma, Michigan broadcasting a hot adult contemporary format. The station was originally and formerly WFYC-FM.

WQBX is the local affiliate for Detroit Tigers baseball and Michigan Wolverines sports. WQBX also provides coverage of local high school sports. Their broadcast team of Jeff Sommerville and Topher Goggin are three-time recipients of the MAB Broadcast Excellence Award for Play-by-Play Sports.

== Sources ==
- Michiguide.com - WQBX History
