= WWRW =

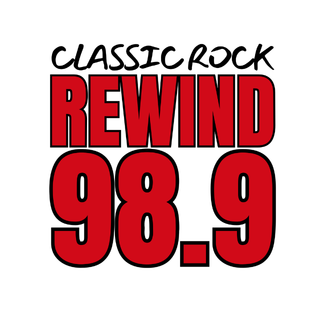
- Big Rapids Township, Michigan; United States
- Broadcast area: Big Rapids, Michigan
- Frequency: 98.9 MHz
- Branding: Rewind 98.9

Programming
- Format: Classic rock

Ownership
- Owner: Mentor Partners, Inc.
- Sister stations: WBRN; WWBR; WYBR

History
- First air date: September 7, 2025
- Call sign meaning: Rewind

Technical information
- Licensing authority: FCC
- Facility ID: 762506
- Class: A
- ERP: 3,500 watts
- HAAT: 133 meters (436 ft)
- Transmitter coordinates: 43°41′1.1″N 85°34′56.2″W

Links
- Public license information: Public file; LMS
- Webcast: Listen Live
- Website: 989rewind.com

WWRW (98.9 FM; "Rewind 98.9") is a radio station licensed to Big Rapids Township, Michigan, and broadcasting a classic rock format. It is owned by Mentor Partners, Inc. The station's an affiliate of the weekly syndicated Pink Floyd program "Floydian Slip." as well as "Alice's Attic" which airs every weeknight 7pm-12m.

== History ==
The construction permit for this facility was obtained by Smile FM, a regional contemporary Christian music network, and traded to Mentor Partners in 2025 in exchange for Mentor-owned translator W256CC, which rebroadcast an HD Radio subchannel of WWBR. The station went on the air September 7, 2025, and absorbed the translator's former Rewind brand and classic rock format.
