= WSRT =

Coordinates: 45.046°N 84.846°W

- Gaylord, Michigan; United States
- Broadcast area: Petoskey, Michigan
- Frequency: 106.7 MHz
- Branding: Star Country 106.7

Programming
- Format: Classic country

Ownership
- Owner: Patricia MacDonald Garber; (MacDonald Garber Broadcasting, Inc.)
- Sister stations: WKLT

History
- First air date: 1972 (as WWRM)
- Former call signs: WKPK (10/1/84-9/14/05); WWRM-FM (11/15/82-10/1/84); WWRM (1972–1982)
- Call sign meaning: Soft Rock, Great Talk (former format)

Technical information
- Facility ID: 1159
- Class: C1
- ERP: 100,000 watts
- HAAT: 177 meters
- Translator: 107.1 W296EJ (Petoskey)

Links
- Website: starcountry1067.com

WSRT (106.7 FM) is a country station that broadcasts out of Gaylord, Michigan. The 100,000-watt station was also simulcast on 105.5 WSRJ Honor/Traverse City until 2020. Throughout most of its life, it was best known as a CHR/Top 40-formatted station known as WKPK ("The Peak").

As former owner Northern Broadcast was moving to sell all their stations , the transmitter on 106.7 was turned off sometime during December 2019. A sale of the station was announced in March 2020.

== History ==
The station began in 1972 as WWRM "Warm 107", airing primarily beautiful music, evolving in 1977 into an easy listening format with a mixture of "B/EZ" instrumentals and vocal adult contemporary hits. The station was the brainchild of John DeGroot and Glen Catt, the founder of the Glen's Markets supermarket chain. The station's first studio was located on the second floor of the Glen's Market in Gaylord.

DeGroot bought Catt out in 1984, and on October 1 of that same year, he switched the format to CHR and changed the call letters from WWRM to WKPK in an attempt to go head-on with the highly successful WKHQ. The new station called itself "107 The Peak" (later modified to "106.7 The Peak" to reflect the increasing prevalence of radios with digital readout). "The Peak" is an affiliate of Scott Shannon's Rockin' America Top 30 Countdown.

Throughout the 1980s and into the early 1990s, KHQ and The Peak would butt heads in the ratings, mainly due to the two being so close to each other on the dial. By the early 1990s, KHQ was the more-adult station while The Peak, with several countdown shows daily and "Peak It Or Plunge It", a voting show, was the hit for the younger crowd. The Peak frequently also played both alternative-rock and rhythmic tracks that few other CHR stations, even in major markets, would touch, while WKHQ stuck to the proven mainstream hits and played rap hits at night if at all. They also experimented with harder rock songs than typically played on Top 40 radio, going so far as to carry the syndicated "Pirate Radio Saturday Night" showcasing hair metal bands, competing with local AOR WKLT. One memorable liner from this period stated, "If you stop at '106' [referring to the rounded-up dial position of WKHQ, then as now at 105.9 on the FM dial], you haven't reached 'The Peak.' The difference is .7." During the 90s, there was a repeater for the station in Alpena at 102.3FM, that had no on air identifier other than the legal ID ending with "...and 102.3 Alpena."

In 1996, DeGroot retired from broadcasting and sold The Peak to Northern Broadcasting, the North Dakotan owners of AOR-formatted WKLT and what is now Classic Hits Music Radio The Fox FM. The ownership change allowed the station, to invest in new equipment, including a new studio. New automation equipment allowed the station to run 24/7 without the need of a night disc jockey, which stood in contrast to the operations of the early 1990s when the station would sign-off at 1 a.m. and return to the air at 5 a.m. The music mix also changed slightly, as The Peak became a somewhat more conventional and more mainstream CHR station, though still playing more rhythmic material and being faster on new music than WKHQ.

Despite excellent ratings and the battle with 106 KHQ still in swing, the station's Grand Rapids-based management decided in 2000 to make the station Hot AC, dumping most of their rap/hip-hop tracks. In 2004, the station became a full-blown AC with the demise of heritage AC WLDR.

The numerous changes to the music alienated listeners, and many continued to call The Peak "the rap station" even though they hadn't played a rap record in years. As a result, the station's Arbitron ratings tanked, and the station crashed to a 0.7 by 2009.

== Crew ==
The Peak, being in the mid-sized Traverse City-Gaylord-Petoskey radio market, has seen both big market DJs in need of a gig and DJs just starting out. The station's alumni include Brent Carey (went on to WDRQ & WDVD Detroit, 96.5 KOIT in San Francisco and PD of WIOG Saginaw, WTWR-FM Toledo, and KCIX/KXLT in Boise, ID), McConnell "Man @ Large" Adams (went on to WIOG, WDRQ, KKDA/K-104 (APD/Nights)Dallas Texas, My 103.9 and Wild 96.3 in Ft. Wayne, and KFAT 92.9 in Anchorage, Alaska; now morning show host at WJIM-FM in Lansing, MI) Aaron Santini (KKHQ PD in Waterloo, Iowa), WQAL (Cleveland) morning jock Rebecca Wilde, Radio Disney jock Aaron K., Terry Cruise (went on to WKFR in Kalamazoo and KHFI in Austin, Texas). Craig Russell, who did 2 tours of duty in the Alpine City, hosted both the Morning Hustle (1993–1995) and the Afternoon Hustle (1999–2004); afternoons at WFGR in Grand Rapids; he is now PD and morning show host on WUPS in Houghton Lake, MI. Andrew Delancey (now Assistant News Director at WCPO in Cincinnati, Ohio, and former WDRQ (Detroit) jock Jake Edwards (now on WDVD). Rob Weaver, who was at the station for over 20 years, is currently the PD of variety hits "Eagle 101.5" (WMJZ) in Gaylord, MI. Heather Leigh is morning co-host at WKHQ 106 KHQ in nearby Petoskey. Jason Young hosted afternoons in mid to late 1990s and is now the morning show host(Racin Jacin)on northern Michigan's heritage rocker, WKLT.

== Changes ==
In late Summer 2005, The Peak changed its call letters to WSRT, which stands for "Soft Rock and Talk".

Northern Radio also consolidated their operations, moving the station from its long-time home in a converted Kingdom Hall of Jehovah's Witnesses to their Traverse City studios. All the local jocks the station has are now based in the Traverse City area.

When the station flipped to AC, they also trimmed their airstaff since mornings and nights/overnights were all satellite-fed by Bob and Sheri and Delilah respectively. In early 2007, the station dropped Bob and Sheri due to poor ratings. The station's current morning show ("Mary in the Morning") is hosted by local businesswoman Mary Rogers, who aims her morning show towards fellow businesswomen.

WSRJ moved from 100.7 to its new frequency of 105.5 in September 2007. This frequency change fueled speculation that the WSRT/WSRJ simulcast would return to CHR, creating a "KHQ sandwich". However, the format remained AC, although the music mix began to skew back toward Hot AC in the fall of 2009, with the station beginning to identify with "Today's Best Hits" (the same slogan used by competing station 92.9 WJZQ "Z93").

WSRT/WSRJ rebranded as "106.7 YOU-FM" in early October 2008. Despite the move back toward a Hot AC direction, the station's basic setup remained in place, with Mary Rogers as morning host and Delilah at night. On May 3, 2010, WSRT/WSRJ switched from Adult Contemporary to a talk radio format becoming the first commercial FM talk station in Northern Michigan. The lineup includes local talk show “Mary in the Morning, Dial Global’s Stephanie Miller, Dave Ramsey, Dr. Laura Schlessinger and Talk Radio Network’s Jerry Doyle.

In August 2012, the pair of stations flipped to sports talk, using programming from ESPN Radio. In addition to national programming and sports play-by-play, WSRT/WSRJ carries high school sports from around Northern Michigan, including four hours of coverage on Friday nights.

== Stations go silent ==
On December 20, 2019, WSRT and WSRJ went silent. WSRJ has since returned to the air airing the Classical music programming of Interlochen Center for the Arts' 88.7 WIAA Interlochen on an interim basis while WIAA is off the air due to tower issues.

In March 2020, it was reported that WSRT and its translator 98.3 W252DA Petoskey were to be sold to MacDonald-Garber Broadcasting for $215,000. The sale would make the 106.7 frequency a sister station to its onetime arch-rival during its CHR/Top 40 era, WKHQ. The sale was consummated on January 13, 2021.

Effective December 3, 2020, WSRJ was sold to Good News Media, Inc. for $350,000.

On September 13, 2021, WSRT returned to the air stunting with Christmas music, as it prepares to launch a new format.

On September 17, 2021, WSRT ended its Christmas music stunt and launched a classic country format, branded as "106.7 Star Country".

== Spring 2007 ratings book ==
In October 2007, Arbitron announced that the Spring 2007 ratings for the Traverse City/Petoskey radio market would be reissued after they discovered diaries had been returned from "media affiliated households." In the notice to subscribers of the report, Arbitron stated that "ratings for radio station WSRT could be substantially affected." Later press reports in various radio related trade websites, including AllAccess.com, revealed that two WSRT employees were either asked to resign or were terminated for their involvement in the incident. All Access and Radio and Records later reported a letter, written by one of the terminated WSRT employees, admitting culpability in the incident with a story about receiving the diaries but not intending to mail them in. (Read those reports at http://www.allaccess.com and https://web.archive.org/web/20060707045334/http://www.radioandrecords.com/.) A new ratings report was issued by Arbitron on Oct. 22nd. The new report has not been made public.
