= WATT =

Radio station in Cadillac, Michigan

Coordinates: 44°13′27″N 85°24′0″W

- Cadillac, Michigan; United States
- Frequency: 1240 kHz
- Branding: News Talk 1240

Programming
- Format: News-Talk-Sports
- Affiliations: Michigan Radio Network

Ownership
- Owner: MacDonald Garber Broadcasting
- Sister stations: WKAD, WKHQ-FM, WLXT, WLXV, WMKT, WMBN

History
- First air date: September 30, 1945

Technical information
- Licensing authority: FCC
- Facility ID: 65928
- Class: C
- Power: 1,000 watts
- Translators: W291DE (106.1 MHz, Cadillac)

Links
- Public license information: Public file; LMS

WATT (1240 AM, "News Talk 1240") is a radio station broadcasting a news-talk-sports format. Licensed to Cadillac, Michigan, it began broadcasting in 1946.

WATT officially began broadcasting on September 30, 1945, as Cadillac's first radio station on the frequency of 1240 kHz. The station was founded by Les Biederman, a broadcast pioneer who had previously launched WTCM in Traverse City. WATT was a key member of Biederman’s Paul Bunyan Network, a group of small-market stations designed to provide localized news and entertainment to Northern Michigan communities. During its early years, WATT operated with a power of 250 watts and served as an NBC Radio Network affiliate, bringing national programming and block-style variety shows to Wexford County residents.

In the 1970s, Les Biederman sold WATT to Kenneth MacDonald Sr., the founder of MacDonald Broadcasting. MacDonald, a former hall-of-fame broadcaster from Saginaw, purchased the station alongside its FM sister (WLXV) and properties in Petoskey.

In 1998, as part of a corporate reorganization of the family business, the Northern Michigan stations—including WATT—were spun off into a separate entity called MacDonald-Garber Broadcasting, headed by Patricia MacDonald-Garber.
