= WMBN =

Coordinates: 45°20′50″N 84°58′01″W

- Petoskey, Michigan; United States
- Broadcast area
- Frequency: 1340 kHz
- Branding: The Ticket

Programming
- Format: Sports
- Affiliations: Fox Sports Radio; Michigan IMG Sports Network

Ownership
- Owner: MacDonald Garber Broadcasting, Inc.
- Sister stations: WATT, WKAD, WKHQ-FM, WLXT, WLXV, WMKT

History
- First air date: April 30, 1947
- Former call signs: WMBN (1947–1980); WWPZ (1980–1992)
- Call sign meaning: Michigan's Beautiful North (previous format)

Technical information
- Licensing authority: FCC
- Facility ID: 65929
- Class: C
- Power: 1,000 watts
- Translator: 104.7 W284DF (Petoskey)

Links
- Public license information: Public file; LMS
- Website: www.theticketnorthernmichigan.com

WMBN ("Michigan's Beautiful North") is an AM radio station broadcasting at 1340 kHz in Petoskey, Michigan, United States. The station, owned by MacDonald Garber Broadcasting, Inc. airs the Fox Sports Radio format of sports.

WMBN went on the air on April 30, 1947, and is the oldest continuously operating radio station still on the air in Petoskey, though its claim of being "Petoskey's first radio station" is technically incorrect since it was preceded on the air by the short-lived WBBP in the 1920s. The station was founded by Les Biederman and, along with WTCM and WTCM-FM in Traverse City, WATZ in Alpena, and the now-defunct WATC in Gaylord, was affiliated with his "Paul Bunyan Network." It was later sold to MacDonald Broadcasting and then spun off into MacDonald Garber Broadcasting, Inc.

The station bore the call sign WWPZ (known as simply "WPZ" on the air) from 1980 to 1992 and had a very wide-ranging, eclectic pop/rock music format similar to today's Variety Hits concept. The station also aired Detroit Tigers baseball during this time. In 1992, the station returned to the WMBN calls and shifted to Westwood One's "AM Only" format of "Original Hits of the '40s, '50s and '60s," which has evolved over the years into the current "America's Best Music" format.

Is an affiliate of the Detroit Tigers, and University of Michigan Football and Basketball.

As of January 2, 2012, WMBN dropped music programming entirely and became a sports talk station broadcasting the Fox Sports Radio format, in simulcast with sister station WKAD 93.7 FM in Cadillac.
