= WHAK-FM =

Coordinates: 45.398°N 83.922°W

- Rogers City, Michigan; United States
- Broadcast area: Alpena, Michigan
- Frequency: 99.9 MHz
- Branding: 99.9 The Wave

Programming
- Format: Classic hits
- Affiliations: Classic Hits (Local Radio Networks); Detroit Lions Radio Network; Detroit Tigers Radio Network; Michigan IMG Sports Network

Ownership
- Owner: Edwards Group Holdings, Inc., Employee Stock Ownership Trust; (Edwards Communications LC)
- Sister stations: WHSB, WIDL, WKYO, WWTH

History
- First air date: 1994 (as WELG)
- Former call signs: WELG (1994–1997)
- Call sign meaning: Harvey A. Klann (original owner)

Technical information
- Licensing authority: FCC
- Facility ID: 29289
- Class: C2
- ERP: 50,000 watts
- HAAT: 145 meters (476 ft)

Links
- Public license information: Public file; LMS
- Website: WHAK-FM Online

WHAK-FM (99.9 MHz, "The Wave") is a radio station licensed to Rogers City, Michigan, with studios in Alpena. The station plays classic hits of the 1980s and 1990s. It has a local weekday-morning show and airs Local Radio Networks' "Classic Hits" format the remainder of the time.

Prior to April 1999, the station broadcast a satellite-fed country format as "Eagle 100" (with the call sign WELG from 1994 to 1997). The move to the oldies format helped to fill a void in the Northeast Michigan radio scene left when 92.5 WAIR (now WFDX) switched from oldies to country music.

WHAK-FM is owned by the Edwards Group Holdings, Inc., Employee Stock Ownership Trust, through licensee Edwards Communications LC, along with WHSB 107.7 in Alpena, and WWTH 100.7 in Oscoda. Former sister station WHAK 960 airs talk programming in a simulcast with WWMN 1110 AM in Petoskey; it is now owned by Mitten News, LLC.

Former logo

The WHAK calls stand for the station's original owner, Harvey A. Klann. Klann is a lifelong resident of Rogers City and World War II veteran.
