= WWBR =

Coordinates: 43.664°N 85.482°W

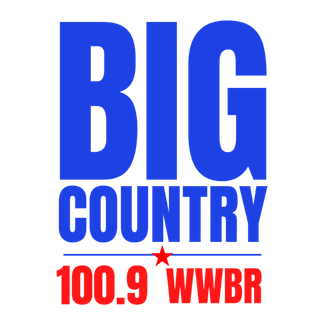
- Big Rapids, Michigan; United States
- Frequency: 100.9 MHz (HD Radio)
- Branding: Big Country 100.9

Programming
- Format: Country
- Subchannels: HD2: Smile FM; HD3: WBRN
- Affiliations: Westwood One

Ownership
- Owner: Mentor Partners, Inc.
- Sister stations: WBRN; WWRW; WYBR

History
- First air date: 1964
- Former call signs: WBRN-FM (1964–7/5/2005)
- Call sign meaning: BR for Big Rapids

Technical information
- Licensing authority: FCC
- Facility ID: 70505
- Class: A
- ERP: 6,000 watts
- HAAT: 97 meters
- Translators: HD2: 95.1 W236DZ (Big Rapids); HD3: 107.7 W299BE (Big Rapids)

Links
- Public license information: Public file; LMS
- Webcast: Listen Live
- Website: bigcountry1009.com

WWBR (100.9 FM) is a radio station broadcasting a country music format in Big Rapids, Michigan. It first began broadcasting in 1964 under the WBRN-FM call sign. Mornings with Etch is the Morning show host.

== HD Radio ==
This station's second HD Radio subchannel and an associated translator broadcast a classic rock format known as Rewind 99.1 until 2025, when Mentor Partners built WWRW (98.9 FM). The permit had been obtained in a swap with Smile FM, a regional contemporary Christian music network, for the translator, which moved to 95.1 MHz. Smile FM is broadcast on the HD2 subchannel of WWBR to feed this translator.
