= WLJN =

WLJN and WLJW

WLJN: Elmwood Township, Michigan; WLJW: Cadillac, Michigan; United States
- Broadcast area: Traverse City, Michigan; Cadillac, Michigan
- Frequencies: WLJN: 1400 kHz; WLJW: 1370 kHz
- Branding: The Source

Programming
- Format: Christian radio

Ownership
- Owner: Northern Christian Radio, Inc
- Sister stations: WLJN-FM, WLJW-FM

History
- First air date: WLJN: December 23, 1982; WLJW: 1967
- Former call signs: WLJW: WWAM (1967–1982); WKJF (1982–2004)
- Call sign meaning: WLJN: "We're Lifting Jesus' Name"; WLJW: "We're Lifting Jesus' Word"

Technical information
- Licensing authority: FCC
- Facility ID: WLJN: 24603; WLJW: 73169
- Class: WLJN: B; WLJW: B
- Power: WLJN: 640 watts; WLJW: 5,000 watts (daytime); 1,000 watts (nighttime)
- Transmitter coordinates: WLJN: 44°46′36″N 85°39′43″W
- Translator(s): WLJN: 104.1 W281CG (Traverse City); WLJW: 100.7 W264DQ (Cadillac)

Links
- Public license information: WLJN: Public file; LMS; WLJW: Public file; LMS
- Webcast: Listen live
- Website: www.northernchristianradio.com/listen-to-the-source

WLJN (1400 AM) and WLJW (1370 AM) are the call letters of two radio stations located in Traverse City, Michigan and Cadillac, Michigan, respectively. Both stations broadcast Christian talk and teaching programming. The call letters stand for "We're Lifting Jesus' Name."

== FM translators ==
WLJN and WLJW are also heard on FM translators in Traverse City and Cadillac.

Call sign	Frequency	City of license	FID	ERP (W)	HAAT	Class	FCC info
W264DQ	100.7 FM	Cadillac, Michigan	202577	250	191 m (627 ft)	D	LMS
W281CG	104.1 FM	Traverse City, Michigan	202545	250	224 m (735 ft)	D	LMS

== History ==
Good News Media, Inc. was established in early 1981 to lay the groundwork for getting the station on the air. Within 2 months after GNMI was started, WTCM changed from 1400 kHz to 580 kHz, opening the way for WLJN to go on the air at the 1400 kHz frequency. The station's first broadcast day was 2 days before Christmas in 1982. In 1994, application was made by GNMI to broadcast at 104.5 MHz, but nothing came about of it as 104.5 in Traverse City is now home to WZTC. In 2004, Cadillac radio station WKJF, 1370 kHz, was acquired by GNMI, and became WLJW shortly afterward, simulcasting WLJN. The call letters for WLJW stand for "We're Lifting Jesus' Word."

WLJN's old logo
