= WCCW (AM) =

Coordinates: 44°40′38″N 85°39′56″W

Traverse City, Michigan; United States
- Broadcast area: Traverse City metropolitan area
- Frequency: 1310 kHz
- Branding: 1310 The Ticket

Programming
- Format: Sports
- Affiliations: Michigan IMG Sports Network

Ownership
- Owner: Midwestern Broadcasting Company
- Sister stations: WATZ-FM, WBCM, WCCW-FM, WJZQ, WRGZ, WTCM, WTCM-FM, WZTK

History
- First air date: 1960
- Call sign meaning: "Cherry Capital of the World"

Technical information
- Licensing authority: FCC
- Facility ID: 20421
- Class: D
- Power: 15,000 watts day

Links
- Public license information: Public file; LMS
- Webcast: Listen Live
- Website: WCCW Online

WCCW (1310 kHz) is a radio station licensed to Traverse City, Michigan, United States, owned by Midwestern Broadcasting. Programming includes syndicated sports talk programs originating from WXYT in Detroit branded as The Ticket as well as ESPN Radio programming nights and weekends.

WCCW is one side of a radio combo in . It is owned by the Midwestern Broadcasting group, which to this day includes the family members of its original partners from the early 1940s, the Biedermans, Kikers and McClays. Midwestern acquired WCCW AM/FM, its long-time "local competitor" in 1996. The highly rated FM station is WCCW-FM, while the AM station is one of the lowest-rated Arbitron-wise in the area.

It airs play-by-play coverage of the Detroit Tigers, Detroit Lions, Detroit Red Wings, Detroit Pistons and Michigan State University sports.

== History ==
WCCW, whose call letters stand for "Cherry Capital of the World", signed on in 1960 under the ownership of John Anderson, a former Midwestern employee who ventured out on his own with contemporary ideas and skills learned working for Midwestern as a salesman in the 1950s.

On November 1, 1967, WCCW added an FM sister at 92.1, which broadcast with 3,000 watts. It was Traverse City's first late night broadcast signal, as both WTCM and WLDR signed off at 11 p.m. This FM originally had an automated beautiful music format.

In the beginning, WCCW was an MOR-formatted station, but added Top 40 afternoon programming in the mid-1960s to appeal to the younger crowd. It was Northwest Michigan's first truly contemporary format, even though in later-dayparts, and was soon followed by WVOY-AM in Charlevoix about 1974.

Jerry Meyer and Bob Burian were both involved in management along with owner John Anderson. Meyer later became operations manager at WTCM in 1976 and went on to co-own Murray's Boats & Motors, was the longtime news anchor for TV 9 and 10, and made a run for state representative. LD Greilick and Michael Bradford were the stations engineers. Bradford went on to establish WBNZ-FM in Beulah-Benzonia.

"Radio Double C" also had Northern Michigan's earliest avant-garde modern rock programming late at night with the "Pen Ultimate" radio show hosted by Al Vasquez ("Alan White") and Carolyn Beaudette, and was the home of Traverse City's first "real" production agency for radio commercials.

By that time, WCCW was carrying the Music of Your Life standards format. Anderson, who still lives to this day, sold WCCW Radio to the Fabiano Brothers of Mt. Pleasant, a well-known beer distributor. At this time, the station was housed in an old converted funeral home next door to the Cherry County Playhouse, sharing quarters with a local chapter of Planned Parenthood as the upstairs tenants. The Fabianos brought in Paul Binsfeld, son of former Lieutenant Governor, and State Senator Connie Binsfeld, to launch the FM side of the facility as WMZK, The Bay's Music. Binsfeld brought his morning man, Mark Blackwell from WSOO/WSUE in Sault Ste. Marie and started an adult contemporary music format which enjoyed some success. The line up included Steve Cook mornings, Ron Jolly middays, Mark Blackwell (who used the stage name Murphey) afternoon drive, and Jim Moriarty evenings. The AM side, still known as WCCW, continued the "Music of Your Life" format using an antiquated automation system set up in what was once the viewing room of the funeral home.

Other broadcasters associated with WCCW in and after its hey-day were Lucien Jaye ("The Boogie Man"), Dave Elliot (later with WTCM 14-T) and Dave Walker (now the longtime news anchor at TV 7&4). Steve Cook went on to be Production Director for WTCM, Mark (Murphey) Blackwell is currently Production Director at WJR Detroit, Ron Jolly became morning man on WTCM-AM, and Jim Moriarty can sometimes still be heard on WCCW-FM playing oldies.

In 1996, the Fabianos sold WCCW combo Radio to Ross Biederman for $3 million, who made drastic improvements to the stations. He moved the stations out of the old Michigan Theatre building on Front St. to a Today Show-esque window studio next in the former Midwestern Cablevision building next door to WTCM.

In 2001, after years of airing some type of MOR format, this time being ABC's "Stardust" ("Unforgettable Music") format, WCCW flipped to sports radio as ESPN Radio 1310 AM. The station airs most of ESPN's schedule.

WCCW is currently a 15 kW days and 7.5 kW nights station. This upgrade was approved in May 2006. With the power boost and upgrade to a full-time signal, it allows Midwestern Broadcasting to air more sports on their AMs. The station has local sports cast in the morning with station manager Brian Hale. Along with being and ESPN affiliate they also carry the broadcast of all the major Detroit sports teams, Tigers, Lions, Red Wings and Pistons. It also broadcasts college basketball and football from MSU, and a variety of sports features on subjects like fishing and NASCAR.

On August 22, 2018, WCCW changed their format from sports to oldies, branded as "AM 13".

On February 5, 2021, WCCW changed their format from oldies to classic country, branded as "WTCM Gold".

On January 5, 2026, WCCW changed their format from classic country to sports, branded as "1310 The Ticket".

== Previous logos ==
(WCCW's logo under previous ESPN Radio affiliation)
