= WWTH =

Radio station in Oscoda, Michigan

Coordinates: 44.578°N 83.378°W

- Oscoda, Michigan; United States
- Broadcast area
- Frequency: 100.7 MHz
- Branding: Thunder 100.7

Programming
- Format: Classic rock
- Affiliations: Compass Media Networks; Westwood One; Detroit Lions Radio Network; Detroit Tigers Radio Network; Michigan IMG Sports Network

Ownership
- Owner: Edwards Group Holdings, Inc., Employee Stock Ownership Trust; (Edwards Communications LC)
- Sister stations: WHAK-FM, WHSB, WIDL, WKYO

History
- First air date: 1992 (as WCLS)
- Former call signs: WCLS (11/13/89-4/4/05)
- Call sign meaning: THunder Rock

Technical information
- Licensing authority: FCC
- Facility ID: 61813
- Class: C3
- ERP: 20,500 watts
- HAAT: 110 meters

Links
- Public license information: Public file; LMS
- Website: truenorthradionetwork.com

WWTH (100.7 FM), Oscoda, Michigan, is a radio station broadcasting a classic rock format to the Oscoda, Tawas, Alpena area of northeastern lower Michigan. The station is known as "Thunder 100.7".

== History ==
The logo for Thunder Country

WWTH was originally WCLS "Sunny 100-dot-7," airing a satellite-fed adult contemporary format from Jones Radio. For a time, WCLS simulcast its programming on 93.9 FM WCLX in Mio, which is now WAVC. In 1998, WCLS was sold from Spectrum Communications to Ives Broadcasting, which also owned WHSB 107.7 FM in Alpena at the time, and became "Kix 100.7," a satellite-fed country station. After only about a year, "Kix" reverted to the "Sunny" satellite AC format.

The second incarnation of "Sunny 100-dot-7" continued until 2004, when the station went silent; it briefly returned to the air simulcasting 99.9 WHAK-FM and then 107.7 WHSB before going silent again. In December 2004, Edwards Communications acquired WCLS along with WHSB and WHAK-AM/FM, and in April 2005, the "Thunder Country" format debuted on 100.7 FM (which sported the new calls WWTH) and 960 AM WHAK. Originally the station was chiefly locally automated with some local announcers, but the station soon went with the "CD Country" satellite format from Jones Radio Networks (since absorbed into Dial Global's Hot Country format). WHAK-AM 960 broke away from the simulcast in the summer of 2012 to simulcast the classic hits format of WHAK-FM.

As "Thunder Country" from 2005 to 2013, WWTH broadcast the "Hot Country" (known on-air as "Today's New Hit Country") satellite feed from Dial Global. The station switched formats to classic rock at 11:00 AM on May 24, 2013. The station syndicates the popular morning show Free Beer and Hot Wings.
