= WMTR-FM =

- Archbold, Ohio; United States
- Broadcast area: Northwest Ohio
- Frequency: 96.1 MHz (HD Radio)
- Branding: 96.1 WMTR

Programming
- Format: Classic hits
- Subchannels: HD2: Country
- Affiliations: AP Radio; Detroit Tigers Radio Network; Ohio Ag Net; Brownfield AG News; Ohio State Sports Network

Ownership
- Owner: Nobco, Inc.

History
- First air date: April 14, 1968
- Former call signs: WHFD (1968–1989)
- Former frequencies: 95.9 MHz (1968–1991)

Technical information
- Licensing authority: FCC
- Facility ID: 48957
- Class: A
- ERP: 3,800 watts
- HAAT: 122 meters (400 ft)
- Transmitter coordinates: 41°33′29.00″N 84°11′8.00″W
- Translator: HD2: 94.3 W232CM (Wauseon)

Links
- Public license information: Public file; LMS

WMTR-FM (96.1 FM) is a commercial radio station licensed to Archbold, Ohio, United States. Airing a classic hits format, it is the primary local station for the Archbold/Fulton County area (including the cities of Delta, Swanton and Wauseon), and its 3,800-watt signal can be heard NW Ohio in the north to Michigan state line. The station is also listenable in the western suburbs of Toledo and is frequently rated in the Toledo Arbitron ratings reports. Its studios are in Archbold and the transmitter is located northeast of the city.

== History ==
WMTR-FM began broadcasting on April 14, 1968, at 95.9 on the FM dial and formerly bore the callsign WHFD (which were the first letters of the 4 counties in its broadcast region—Williams, Henry, Fulton, and Defiance). The current call letters were adopted in 1989 and are legally WMTR-FM due to there being a WMTR (AM) in Morristown, New Jersey. Programming over the years has changed from adult contemporary to oldies as "96 Gold" to the current classic/adult hits format. The station is owned by Northwestern Ohio Broadcasting Corporation and prides itself on the fact that it is still locally owned and operated. Max Smith, Sr. founded the station, which is managed today by his son, Max Smith, Jr. In a note of historical significance, WMTR-FM was one of the first commercial radio stations in the nation to convert to DAT technology in the late 1980s, considered state-of-the-art for the time.

WMTR-FM also has a strong sports commitment. WMTR covers high school sports and carries both Detroit Tigers baseball and Ohio State University football.

The station acquired an FM translator at 94.3 (W232CM) in late 2016. W232CM relays the HD2 signal of WMTR-FM, offering country music to the Wauseon area.

The station is an affiliate of the "Floydian Slip" syndicated Pink Floyd program.
