= WHAK (AM) =

- Rogers City, Michigan; United States
- Frequency: 960 kHz

Programming
- Format: Silent

Ownership
- Owner: John P. Yob; (Mitten News LLC)

History
- First air date: May 1949

Technical information
- Licensing authority: FCC
- Facility ID: 29286
- Class: D
- Power: 5,000 watts day; 136 watts night
- Transmitter coordinates: 45.398°N 83.921°W

Links
- Public license information: Public file; LMS

WHAK (960 AM) is a radio station licensed to Rogers City, Michigan. The station is owned by John Yob, through licensee Mitten News LLC.

== History ==
The station began broadcasting in May 1949, and originally ran 1,000 watts, during daytime hours only. The station's power was increased to 5,000 watts in 1953. The station aired a MOR format in the 1970s and 1980s. By 1990, the station had begun airing a country music format. In 1997, the station began to simulcast 99.9 WHAK-FM, airing country music programming from Westwood One. In 1999, 99.9 WHAK adopted an oldies format, ending the simulcast.

The station was taken silent in October 2000. In October 2001, the station returned to the air, airing a talk radio format as a full-time affiliate of the Michigan Talk Radio Network. In 2005, the station began airing a country music format, as "Thunder Country", simulcasting 100.7 WWTH in Oscoda, Michigan. When WWTH adopted a classic rock format in 2012, WHAK began airing a classic hits format, simulcasting 99.9 WHAK-FM. By 2016, the station had adopted a conservative talk format, as "Your Patriot Voice".

On March 31, 2023, WHAK went silent, due to the end of an LMA between Blarney Stone Broadcasting and Mitten News.
