= WLJN-FM =

WLJN-FM and WLJD

WLJN-FM: Traverse City, Michigan; WLJD: Charlevoix, Michigan; United States
- Broadcast area: Traverse City metro
- Frequencies: WLJN-FM: 88.9 MHz; WLJD: 107.9 MHz
- Branding: WLJN

Programming
- Format: Christian radio

Ownership
- Owner: Northern Christian Radio, Inc
- Sister stations: WLJN, WLJW, WLJW-FM

History
- First air date: WLJN-FM: October 1, 1989; WLJD: January 2003
- Former call signs: WLJD: WCZW (2003–2015)
- Call sign meaning: "We're Lifting Jesus's Name"

Technical information
- Licensing authority: FCC
- Facility ID: WLJN-FM: 24607; WLJD: 87539
- Class: WLJN-FM: C1; WLJD: A
- ERP: WLJN-FM: 100,000 watts; WLJD: 5,000 watts
- HAAT: WLJN-FM: 169 meters (554 ft); WLJD: 50 meters (160 ft)
- Transmitter coordinates: WLJN-FM: 44°46′36″N 85°39′43″W

Links
- Public license information: WLJN-FM: Public file; LMS; WLJD: Public file; LMS
- Website: northernchristianradio.com/listen-to-wljn

WLJN-FM (89.9 FM) is a radio station licensed to Traverse City, Michigan. WLJN-FM airs a format consisting of Contemporary Christian music and a few Christian talk and teaching programs, and is owned by Northern Christian Radio, Inc. WLJN-FM signed on the air on October 1, 1989.

Good News Media purchased the silent WCZW (107.9 FM) in Charlevoix, Michigan from Midwestern Broadcasting Company in December 2015. WCZW, which had been simulcasting the classic hits format of WCCW-FM, switched to a simulcast of WLJN-FM. The station took on new call letters of WLJD effective December 29, 2015, although the change was not reflected by the Federal Communications Commission until August 2016.
