= WBRN (AM) =

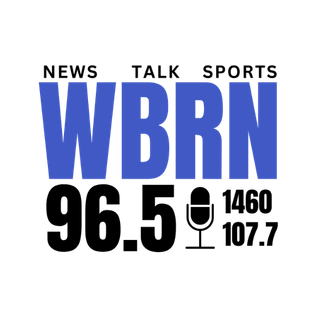
- Big Rapids, Michigan; United States
- Frequency: 1460 kHz
- Branding: Newsradio WBRN 1460 & 96.5 FM

Programming
- Format: News/Talk
- Affiliations: Fox News Radio; Premiere Networks; Westwood One; Detroit Lions Radio Network; Detroit Tigers Radio Network; Detroit Red Wings

Ownership
- Owner: Mentor Partners, Inc.
- Sister stations: WWBR; WWRW; WYBR

History
- First air date: 1953
- Call sign meaning: "Big Rapids, Michigan"

Technical information
- Licensing authority: FCC
- Facility ID: 70506
- Class: B
- Power: 5,000 watts (day); 2,500 watts (night)
- Transmitter coordinates: 43°39′49″N 85°28′54″W
- Translator: 96.5 W243EN (Big Rapids)
- Repeater: 100.9 WWBR-HD3 (Big Rapids)

Links
- Public license information: Public file; LMS
- Webcast: Listen live
- Website: wbrn.com

WBRN (1460 AM) is a north American radio station broadcasting a news/talk format. Licensed to Big Rapids, Michigan, it first began broadcasting in 1953.

WBRN carries a mostly syndicated talk radio format affiliated with the Premiere Networks and Westwood One talk lineups on weekdays (Michigan's Big Show with Michael Patrick Shiels, Kilmeade & Friends, The Vince Show, The Sean Hannity Show, The Mark Levin Show, The Dave Ramsey Show, and Coast to Coast AM) and Fox News Radio on weekends.

Other weekend programming includes The Kim Komando Show, Rich on Tech, Radio Health Journal, Frontlines of Freedom, Gun Talk, It's Bill Cunningham, The Ben Ferguson Show, and the Hillsdale Hour.
