= WLXV =

Radio station in Cadillac, Michigan

Simulcasting WLXT Petoskey
- Cadillac, Michigan; United States
- Broadcast area: Northern Michigan
- Frequency: 96.7 MHz
- Branding: Lite 96.3 & 96.7

Programming
- Format: Adult contemporary

Ownership
- Owner: MacDonald Garber Broadcasting
- Sister stations: WATT, WKAD, WKHQ-FM, WLXT, WMKT, WMBN

History
- First air date: July 7, 1974
- Former call signs: WITW (1974–1983); WEVZ (1983–1987); WWLZ (1987–1994)
- Call sign meaning: "Lite 96" (previous format)

Technical information
- Licensing authority: FCC
- Facility ID: 39539
- Class: C3
- ERP: 7,200 watts
- HAAT: 184 meters
- Transmitter coordinates: 44°22′51.0″N 85°33′24.2″W

Links
- Public license information: Public file; LMS
- Webcast: Listen live
- Website: www.lite96.com

WLXV (96.7 FM) is a radio station licensed to Cadillac, Michigan.

== History ==
The station, which began broadcasting on July 7, 1974, has previously programmed easy listening and adult contemporary music as WITW, beautiful music as WEVZ, and CHR as WWLZ ("Lakes FM"). WWLZ was changed in 1994 to a simulcast of WLXT 96.3 FM in Petoskey, which continued until MacDonald-Garber Broadcasting, believing the Cadillac area needed its own music station (as opposed to simulcasts of stations from Traverse City or elsewhere), began the "Mix" format.

Mix 96.7 was programmed locally by Chris Nicholas, Program Director and Morning Show Host (the station used satellite programming from Westwood One Local's Hot AC format). Weekend programming included the Hot AC version of American Top 40 with Ryan Seacrest Sundays 8 am till 12 pm; The Hollywood5 with Kidd Kraddick Saturday Mornings from 6 am - 10 am; and The Beacon with Austin Harris on Sunday mornings.

WLXV also shares the same location and houses studios for its sister station 93.7 The Ticket which includes the nationally known show Free Beer and Hot Wings from 5 am till 9 am Monday thru Friday and 5 am till 10 am on Saturday. The rest of the format on WKAD is sports talk. WLXV's other sister station is WATT-AM which is a heritage station in the market and has been news talk for years. Mix 96.7 is one of two Hot AC stations in Cadillac, the other being WCDY 107.9 FM which leans more toward CHR/Top 40.

On September 3, 2015, Mix signed off after 13 years, and 96.7 began stunting with a ticking clock. With sweepers stating "Tomorrow morning get ready to ride", WLXV the next day flipped to Country as "96.7 The Bull", launching with 10,000 songs in a row.

On November 7, 2025, WLXV changed their format from country to a simulcast of adult-contemporary-formatted WLXT 96.3 FM Petoskey, branded as "Lite 96.3 & 96.7".
