= Gratiot Community Airport =

Airport in Michigan, United States

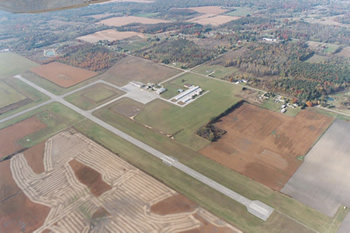
- IATA: AMN; ICAO: KAMN; FAA LID: AMN

Summary
- Airport type: Public
- Owner: City of Alma & County of Gratiot
- Serves: Alma, Michigan
- Elevation AMSL: 754 ft (230 m)
- Coordinates: 43°19′20″N 084°41′17″W

Map
- Location of airport in Michigan AMN (the United States)

Runways
Direction	Length		Surface
Direction	ft	m	Surface
9/27	5,004	1,525	Asphalt
18/36	3,197	974	Asphalt

Statistics (2019)
- Aircraft operations: 9,500
- Based aircraft: 35
- Source: Federal Aviation Administration

Gratiot Community Airport (IATA: AMN, ICAO: KAMN, FAA LID: AMN) is a public use airport located three nautical miles (6 km) southwest of the central business district of Alma, a city in Gratiot County, Michigan, United States. It is owned by the city and county. It is included in the Federal Aviation Administration (FAA) National Plan of Integrated Airport Systems for 2017–2021, in which it is categorized as a local general aviation facility.

The airport is staffed between 8 am and 6 pm. It is accessible by road from Seaman Rd, and is close to U.S. Highway 127.

== Facilities and aircraft ==
Gratiot Community Airport covers an area of 631 acres (255 ha) at an elevation of 754 feet (230 m) above mean sea level. It has two asphalt paved runways: 9/27 is 5,004 by 75 feet (1,525 x 23 m) and 18/36 is 3,197 by 75 feet (974 x 23 m).

For the 12-month period ending December 31, 2019, the airport had 9,500 general aviation aircraft operations, an average of 26 per day. At that time, there were 35 aircraft based at this airport: 29 single-engine and 6 multi-engine airplanes.

The airport has an FBO offering fuel, courtesy cars, a crew lounge, and more.

== Accidents and incidents ==
- On July 23, 2010, a Cessna U206F Stationair ditched into Lake Michigan after departing from Gratiot Community Airport. The engine lost power after reaching cruise altitude and was unable to make it back to the airport. The loss of power was due to fuel starvation as a result of accumulated debris in the fuel system from an undetermined sourced.
- On May 28, 2022, a Piper PA-28 Cherokee landed in a field near the airport while attempting to land at the airport following a series of mechanical issues. The accident is under investigation, but a fuel pump issue may be to blame.

== See also ==
- List of airports in Michigan
