= WLJW-FM =

Radio station in Fife Lake, Michigan

- Fife Lake, Michigan; United States
- Broadcast area: Traverse City, Michigan; Cadillac, Michigan
- Frequency: 95.9 MHz
- Branding: 95.9 & 105.5 Fuel FM

Programming
- Format: Contemporary Christian

Ownership
- Owner: Northern Christian Radio
- Sister stations: WLJN, WLJW, WLJN-FM

History
- First air date: 2014
- Call sign meaning: We're Lifting Jesus' Word

Technical information
- Licensing authority: FCC
- Facility ID: 190434
- Class: C2
- ERP: 19,000 watts
- HAAT: 249 meters (817 ft)
- Transmitter coordinates: 44°35′41″N 85°11′54″W
- Repeater: 105.5 WSRJ (Honor)

Links
- Public license information: Public file; LMS
- Webcast: Listen live
- Website: myfuelfm.com

WLJW-FM is a radio station licensed to Fife Lake, Michigan, broadcasting on 95.9 FM. WLJW-FM airs a Contemporary Christian music format and is owned by Northern Christian Radio. The station began broadcasting in 2014, airing a Christian CHR format branded "95.9 Fuel FM".

== Simulcast ==
In 2020, Good News Media purchased WSRJ in Honor, Michigan for $205,000, and WLJW-FM's programming began to be simulcast on the station.

Call sign	Frequency	City of license	FID	ERP (W)	HAAT	Class	FCC info
WSRJ	105.5 FM	Honor, Michigan	82684	17,000	112 m (367 ft)	C3	LMS
