= Fabiano Brothers =

American beverage distributor

Fabiano Brothers, Inc.
- Type: Private
- Industry: Beverage Wholesale and Distribution
- Founded: 1885; 141 years ago in Sant'Ippolito, Italy
- Founder: Gennaro Fabiano
- Headquarters: Bay City, Michigan, United States
- Owners: James C. Fabiano II; Joseph R. Fabiano II
- Website: www.fabianobrothers.com

Fabiano Brothers, Inc. is an American beverage distributor based in Bay City, Michigan and serving Mid-Michigan, Detroit, and Wisconsin regions. They are Michigan's largest beer wholesaler.

== History ==
Fabiano Brothers was founded by Gennaro Fabiano in 1885 as cantina in Sant'Ippolito, Italy. The cantina remains open and operated by relatives of the founder. The business and family immigrated to Eaton Rapids, Michigan in 1911 where they opened a fruit market. In 1915, they relocated to Lansing, Michigan and opened a new store. They once again relocated in 1919 to Mount Pleasant, Michigan where the company remained until 2009.

The company began construction of a new facility on 40 acres (16 ha) in Monitor Township, near Bay City, Michigan in 2008, where it relocated its operations in 2009.

Fabiano Brothers nearly doubled its operations with the acquisition of Flint-based Tom Ryan Distributing Company in December 2010.

In 2018, the company expanded it operations into the Detroit region with the purchase of the distribution rights of Great Lakes Beverage in Detroit from the Howard Wolpin family, and Hubert Distributing in Pontiac from the Tom Vella family.

== Operations ==
Fabiano Brothers is headquartered in Monitor Township, Michigan with additional offices in Detroit and Wausau, Wisconsin, near Schofield, Wisconsin. They have distribution facilities in Monitor Township and Petoskey, Michigan as well as Wausau, Wisconsin.

The company sells and distributes beverages to businesses in approximately 24 counties throughout the Mid-Michigan, Detroit, and Wisconsin areas. It has over 3,500 clients including retailers and restaurants such as 7-Eleven, Applebee's, Buffalo Wild Wings, CVS Pharmacy, Dollar General, and Walmart.

Depending on the market, brands available vary but may include Absopure Water, Amstel, Arizona Tea, Budweiser, Pabst, and Red Bull.

As of 2026, Fabiano Brothers is the largest beer wholesaler in Michigan, and is a top 20 wholesaler nationally with Anheuser-Busch.

It is managed by James C. Fabiano II and Joseph R. Fabiano II, fourth-generation family owners. The company employees approximately 500 people.
