= WKYO =

- Caro, Michigan; United States
- Broadcast area: (Daytime) (Nighttime)
- Frequency: 1360 kHz
- Branding: 1360 The Saloon

Programming
- Format: Classic Country
- Affiliations: ABC Information Network; Michigan Farm Radio Network; Michigan Radio Network

Ownership
- Owner: Edwards Group Holdings, Inc., Employee Stock Ownership Trust; (Edwards Communications LC)
- Sister stations: WHAK-FM, WHSB, WIDL, WWTH

History
- First air date: May 19, 1962

Technical information
- Licensing authority: FCC
- Facility ID: 29679
- Class: B
- Power: 1,000 watts
- Transmitter coordinates: 43°27′32″N 83°23′39″W

Links
- Public license information: Public file; LMS
- Website: wkyoam.com

WKYO (1360 AM) is a radio station licensed to Caro, Michigan broadcasting a classic country format. Until 2017, the station played a 1960s based oldies format. Prior to that, WKYO had carried a long-running classic country format, using ABC Radio's Real Country satellite feed.

WKYO carries the syndicated Big D and Bubba in mornings, with Local Radio Networks' Superstar Country format the rest of the day. News and sports updates during the day come from the Michigan News Network, based out of Detroit's WWJ. Previously WKYO was a heritage full-service station which aired farm programming from MFRN; local news, ABC Radio News, daily obituary reports, Detroit Tigers baseball, Detroit Red Wings hockey, Red Eye Radio, and the Trading Post, a longtime station feature airing weekdays at 11am where listeners could buy/trade and sell items.

On November 1, 2017, WKYO changed its format from oldies to classic country, branded as "Classic Country WKYO". (info taken from stationintel.com)
