= WJZQ =

Radio station in Cadillac, Michigan

Coordinates: 44.595°N 85.198°W

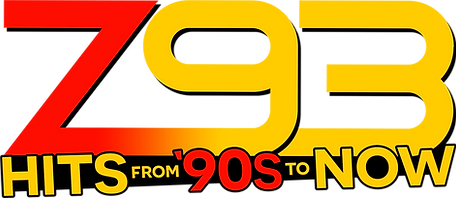
- Cadillac, Michigan; United States
- Broadcast area: Traverse City, Michigan Cadillac, Michigan
- Frequency: 92.9 MHz
- Branding: Z93

Programming
- Format: Hot adult contemporary

Ownership
- Owner: Midwestern Broadcasting Company
- Sister stations: WATZ-FM, WBCM, WCCW, WCCW-FM, WRGZ, WTCM, WTCM-FM, WZTK

History
- First air date: 1961 (as WWTV-FM)
- Former call signs: WKJF-FM (1/1/82-7/1/01); WKJF (?-1/1/82); WWTV-FM (1961-?)
- Call sign meaning: Smooth JazZ Q (previous format)

Technical information
- Licensing authority: FCC
- Facility ID: 5207
- Class: C1
- ERP: 100,000 watts
- HAAT: 278 meters (912 ft)

Links
- Public license information: Public file; LMS
- Webcast: Listen live
- Website: z93hits.com

WJZQ (92.9 FM "Z93") is a 100,000-watt radio station broadcasting a hot adult contemporary format from Cadillac, Michigan. It is owned by Midwestern Broadcasting, which also owns WTCM-AM/FM, WCCW-AM/FM, WKLT and others, all in Traverse City, MI.

== History ==
=== Z93: The 90s to Now ===
On January 25, 2023, WJZQ began teasing that "changes" would be coming, though continuing to play "Today's Best Hits... for now", hyping that the new "update" of Z93 would have its "world premiere" on February 1, at 9:29 A.M. At that time, WJZQ shifted to hot adult contemporary, keeping the "Z93" branding, while repositioning its playlist to add more music from the 1990s onward, with the new branding "Hits From the 90s to Now". The first song under the updated format was "Tearin' Up My Heart" by NSYNC.
