= WATZ-FM =

Radio station in Alpena, Michigan

Coordinates: 44.857°N 83.543°W

- Alpena, Michigan; United States
- Broadcast area: Alpena, Michigan
- Frequency: 99.3 MHz
- Branding: 99.3 WATZ

Programming
- Format: Country
- Affiliations: Michigan Radio Network

Ownership
- Owner: Midwestern Broadcasting Company; (WATZ Radio, Inc.)
- Sister stations: WBCM, WCCW, WCCW-FM, WJZQ, WKLT, WRGZ, WTCM, WTCM-FM, WZTK

History
- First air date: 1967 (at 93.5)
- Former frequencies: 93.5 MHz (1967–1988)
- Call sign meaning: similar to "watts"

Technical information
- Licensing authority: FCC
- Facility ID: 71108
- Class: C2
- ERP: 17,000 watts
- HAAT: 257 meters (843 ft)

Links
- Public license information: Public file; LMS
- Webcast: Listen live
- Website: watz.com

WATZ-FM (99.3 MHz, "99.3 WATZ") is a radio station broadcasting a country music format. The station is licensed to the city of Alpena. WATZ has been assigned the same call sign since it signed on in the late 1960s. The station, along with sister station WZTK, is currently owned by Midwestern Broadcasting Company. From 2006 to 2020, the station simulcasted on Rogers City-based station WRGZ at 96.7 FM.

== WATZ history ==
WATZ signed-on the air in 1967, as an adult contemporary station at 93.5 FM, known for several years as "Z93." In 1988, the format of WATZ-FM was changed to country and the frequency-signal moved to 99.3 so that the station could boost its power from 3,000 to 50,000 watts. For the next several years, WATZ-FM simulcasted the long-time country music format of sister station WATZ AM. In the mid-90s, WATZ AM had switched to a news/talk format while WATZ-FM retained the country format. WATZ-FM became a 24-hour broadcaster in 1999, using a satellite feed from Jones Radio Networks from 11 p.m. to 5:30 a.m. Prior to this, the station went off the air at 1 a.m.

Former logo

== WATZ today ==
WATZ-FM remains locally owned and operated by the same company that founded the AM station in 1946. All of its programming from 5:30 a.m. to 11 p.m. on weekdays, and during the day on weekends (except for syndicated shows such as Bob Kingsley's Country Top 40) is broadcast from the station’s studios in downtown Alpena.
