= WMKT =

Coordinates: 45°16′22″N 85°15′08″W

- Charlevoix, Michigan; United States
- Broadcast area: Traverse City-Petoskey
- Frequency: 1270 kHz
- Branding: 102.3 & 103.3FM 1270AM WMKT

Programming
- Format: Talk
- Affiliations: Fox News Radio; Compass Media Networks; Westwood One; Michigan IMG Sports Network

Ownership
- Owner: MacDonald Garber Broadcasting
- Sister stations: WLXT, WSRT, WKHQ-FM, WZTC, WLXV, WMBN

History
- First air date: July 20, 1974
- Former call signs: WVOY (1974–1986); WKOS (5/1/1986–6/9/1986); WKHQ (1986–1989)

Technical information
- Licensing authority: FCC
- Class: B (AM)
- Power: 27,000 watts day; 5,000 watts night
- Translators: 102.3 W272CR (Petoskey); 103.3 W277DY (Petoskey)

Links
- Public license information: Public file; LMS
- Webcast: Listen Live
- Website: wmktthetalkstation.com

WMKT (1270 AM) is a radio station licensed to Charlevoix, Michigan, broadcasting a talk radio format. The station also broadcasts on two FM translators on W272CR 102.3 (formerly 92.1) and W277DY 103.3 and streams online. The station features local programming with local news and weather forecasts by Nick Rhudy every weekday during the 6 AM to Noon hours. Nick Rhudy also has a daily, local radio show from 5 PM to 6 PM, "Talk of the North with Nick Rhudy. The rest of the station's lineup are from syndicated sources. The station is a Fox News Radio affiliate.

WMKT officially signed on the air on July 20, 1974, originally using the call letters WVOY. The station operated on 1270 kHz and initially served the Charlevoix and Petoskey areas with a variety of local programming. Over the following decades, the station underwent several call sign changes, briefly becoming WKOS in May 1986 and WKHQ in June 1986, before adopting its current identity as WMKT in July 1989.

The station is an affiliate of several major sports networks, including the Detroit Tigers Radio Network and the Michigan Sports Network (Learfield), carrying Michigan Wolverines football and basketball games. Locally, WMKT provides a vital overflow for high school sports; during scheduling conflicts with Detroit Tigers games, the station carries live play-by-play for Petoskey Northmen football and basketball.

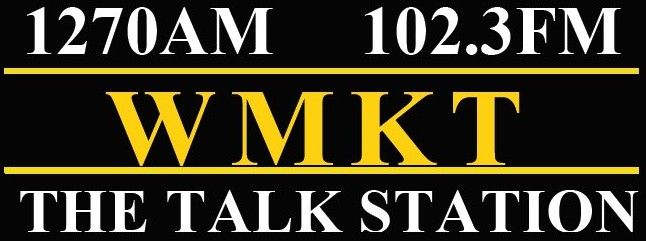
Former logo
