= Alma, Michigan =

- City
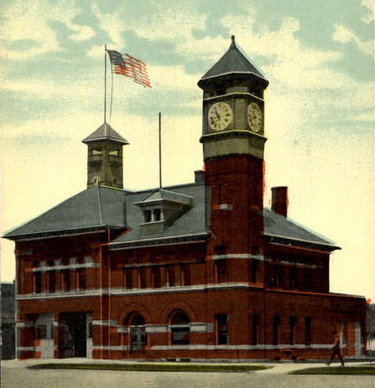
- Alma City Hall

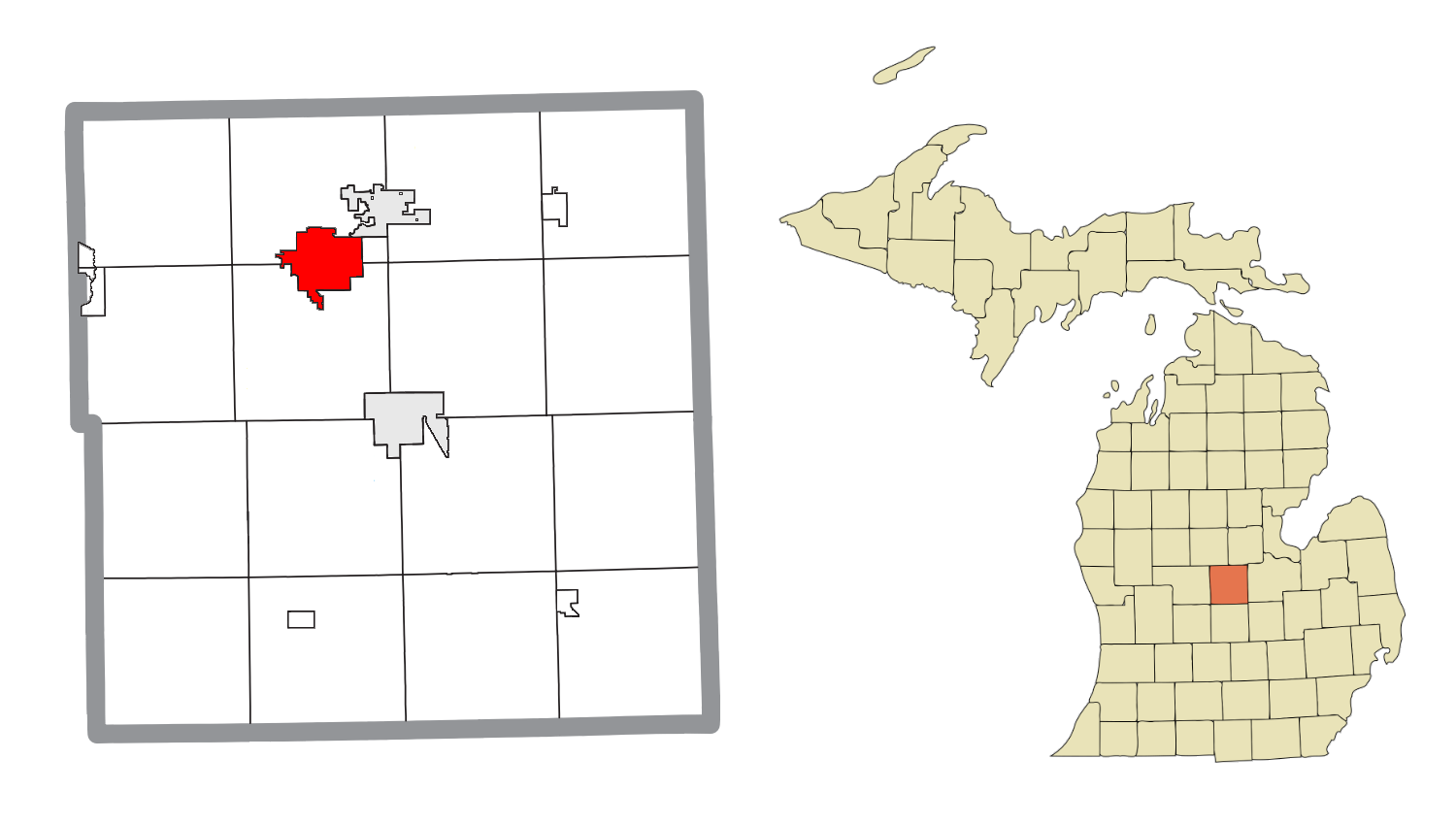
- Location within Gratiot County

- Location within the state of Michigan Location within the United States
- Coordinates: 43°22′42″N 84°39′34″W
- Country: United States
- State: Michigan
- County: Gratiot

Area
  - Total: 6.05 sq mi (15.67 km^{2})
  - Land: 5.89 sq mi (15.26 km^{2})
  - Water: 0.16 sq mi (0.41 km^{2})
- Elevation: 735 ft (224 m)

Population (2020)
  - Total: 9,488
  - Density: 1,610.3/sq mi (621.75/km^{2})
- Time zone: UTC-5 (Eastern (EST))
  - Summer (DST): UTC-4 (EDT)
- ZIP codes: 48801-48802
- Area code: 989
- FIPS code: 26-01540
- GNIS feature ID: 0620002
- Website: myalma.org

Alma is the largest city in Gratiot County in the U.S. state of Michigan. The population was 9,488 at the 2020 census. It was incorporated as the Village of Alma in 1872 and became a city in 1905.

Alma hosts the annual Highland Festival on Memorial Day weekend. It brings members of Scottish clans and interested onlookers together for a weekend of Highland dancing, bagpipes, kilts, and camaraderie.

Alma College, a small liberal-arts institution of approximately 1,300 students, is located in town and focuses on multidisciplinary learning in a residential setting.

== Geography ==
According to the United States Census Bureau, the city has a total area of 6.09 square miles (15.77 km^{2}), of which 5.93 square miles (15.36 km^{2}) is land and 0.16 square miles (0.41 km^{2}) is water.

== History ==
Alma was founded in 1853 by Ralph Ely. Perhaps first known for the Alma Springs Sanitarium, built and promoted in the 1880s by millionaire lumberman and capitalist Ammi W. Wright, it achieved its greatest prominence nationally in the 1910s and 1920s as home of the Republic Motor Truck Company, briefly the largest exclusive truck manufacturer in the world. At one point, Republic was the maker of one out of every nine trucks on the roads in the United States. It was one of the major suppliers of "Liberty trucks" used by American troops during World War I.

Alma was the home of Leonard Refineries which sold gasoline and other petroleum products throughout the lower peninsula of Michigan from its founding in 1936 until about 1966, when it became Total Refineries until its closing in 1999 and demolition in 2003. In 1953 Alma became the first place that high-octane gas, 96 octane, was produced.

== Demographics ==
Historical population
Census	Pop.	Note	%±
1870	402		—
1880	437		8.7%
1890	1,655		278.7%
1900	2,047		23.7%
1910	2,757		34.7%
1920	7,542		173.6%
1930	6,734		−10.7%
1940	7,202		6.9%
1950	8,341		15.8%
1960	8,978		7.6%
1970	9,611		7.1%
1980	9,652		0.4%
1990	9,034		−6.4%
2000	9,275		2.7%
2010	9,383		1.2%
2020	9,488		1.1%
U.S. Decennial Census

=== 2020 census ===
As of the 2020 census, Alma had a population of 9,488. The median age was 30.5 years. 31.8% of residents were under the age of 18 and 15.7% were 65 years of age or older. For every 100 females there were 99.2 males, and for every 100 females age 18 and over there were 91.2 males.

96.0% of residents lived in urban areas, while 4.0% lived in rural areas.

There were 3,313 households in Alma, of which 29.9% had children under the age of 18 living in them. Of all households, 36.8% were married-couple households, 20.9% were households with a male householder and no spouse or partner present, and 33.3% were households with a female householder and no spouse or partner present. About 34.8% of all households were made up of individuals and 14.6% had someone living alone who was 65 years of age or older.

There were 3,577 housing units, of which 7.4% were vacant. The homeowner vacancy rate was 1.9% and the rental vacancy rate was 6.7%.

Racial composition as of the 2020 census
Race	Number	Percent
White	7,903	83.3%
Black or African American	314	3.3%
American Indian and Alaska Native	52	0.5%
Asian	93	1.0%
Native Hawaiian and Other Pacific Islander	24	0.3%
Some other race	526	5.5%
Two or more races	576	6.1%
Hispanic or Latino (of any race)	1,250	13.2%

=== Income and poverty ===
According to Census Bureau QuickFacts, the median income for a household in the city was $36,408; about 24.7% of the population were below the poverty line, including 34.7% of those under age 18 and 12.4% of those age 65 or over. The employment rate in the city was 54.2%.

=== 2010 census ===
As of the census of 2010, there were 9,383 people, 3,468 households, and 2,033 families living in the city. The population density was 1,582.3 inhabitants per square mile (610.9/km^{2}). There were 3,784 housing units at an average density of 638.1 per square mile (246.4/km^{2}). The racial makeup of the city was 92.8% White, 0.9% African American, 0.6% Native American, 0.8% Asian, 2.8% from other races, and 2.2% from two or more races. Hispanic or Latino of any race were 8.1% of the population.

There were 3,468 households, of which 30.8% had children under the age of 18 living with them, 38.4% were married couples living together, 15.2% had a female householder with no husband present, 5.0% had a male householder with no wife present, and 41.4% were non-families. 34.7% of all households were made up of individuals, and 14.8% had someone living alone who was 65 years of age or older. The average household size was 2.30 and the average family size was 2.92.

The median age in the city was 30.8 years. 21.4% of residents were under the age of 18; 21.3% were between the ages of 18 and 24; 21.1% were from 25 to 44; 20.7% were from 45 to 64; and 15.6% were 65 years of age or older. The gender makeup of the city was 46.9% male and 53.1% female.

=== 2000 census ===
As of the census of 2000, there were 9,275 people, 3,220 households, and 2,022 families living in the city. The population density was 1,729.7 inhabitants per square mile (667.8/km^{2}). There were 3,476 housing units at an average density of 648.2 per square mile (250.3/km^{2}). The racial makeup of the city was 93.75% White, 0.53% African American, 0.52% Native American, 0.75% Asian, 0.01% Pacific Islander, 2.57% from other races, and 1.88% from two or more races. Hispanic or Latino of any race were 6.21% of the population.

There were 3,220 households, out of which 32.4% had children under the age of 18 living with them, 45.6% were married couples living together, 13.8% had a female householder with no husband present, and 37.2% were non-families. 30.5% of all households were made up of individuals, and 12.9% had someone living alone who was 65 years of age or older. The average household size was 2.39 and the average family size was 2.98.

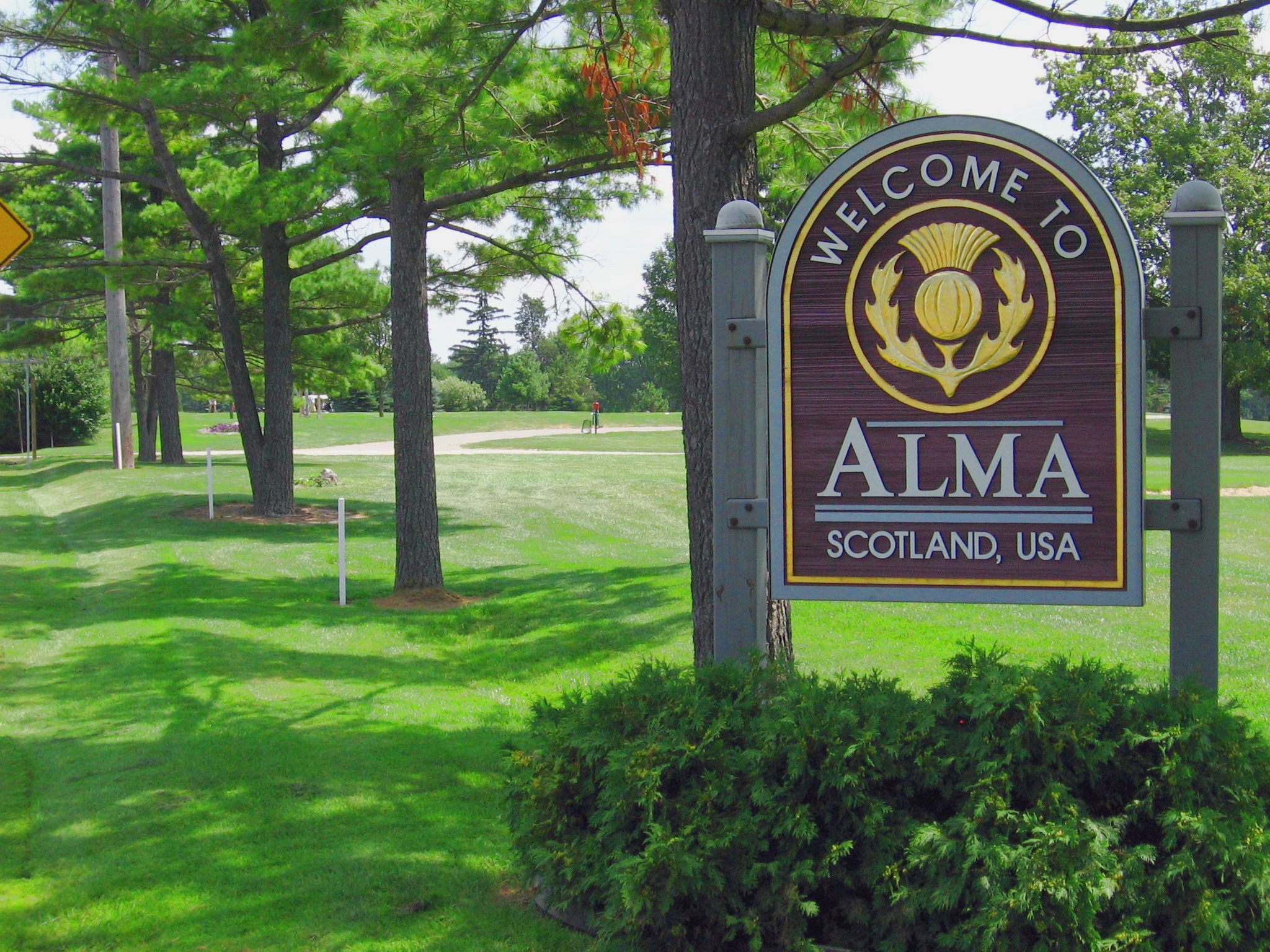
A sign welcoming visitors to "Scotland, USA" (Alma, Michigan)

In the city, the population was spread out, with 21.9% under the age of 18, 20.4% from 18 to 24, 23.0% from 25 to 44, 17.8% from 45 to 64, and 16.9% who were 65 years of age or older. The median age was 32 years. For every 100 females, there were 81.8 males. For every 100 females age 18 and over, there were 77.3 males.

The median income for a household in the city was $33,536, and the median income for a family was $44,229. Males had a median income of $35,013 versus $20,655 for females. The per capita income for the city was $18,218. About 8.5% of families and 11.6% of the population were below the poverty line, including 12.1% of those under age 18 and 7.6% of those age 65 or over.

== Transportation ==
- US 127
- Bus. US 127
- M-46
- Public bus transportation is provided on a dial-a-ride service basis by the Alma Transit Center from 7:00 a.m.-8:00 p.m. during weekdays. The transportation service is available for Alma, St. Louis, Ithaca and Pine River Township.
- Indian Trails provides daily intercity bus service to Alma between St. Ignace and East Lansing, Michigan.
- General aviation services are available at Gratiot Community Airport, located about 3 miles southwest of the city.

== Local media ==
The Morning Sun newspaper, based in Mt. Pleasant, serves the Alma area as its daily newspaper. The Gratiot County Herald, based in Ithaca, serves the Alma area as its weekly newspaper. Alma is home to three commercial radio stations. WQBX (104.9 FM) plays satellite-fed hot adult contemporary music, and sister station WFYC (1280 AM) is an ESPN Radio affiliate.

Standalone AM WMLM (1520 AM), licensed to nearby St. Louis, plays classic country music, also satellite-fed.

The Alma area is located about midway between Saginaw and Grand Rapids, and thus also receives TV and radio signals from both cities, as well as Mt. Pleasant and Lansing.

== Notable people ==
- Keegan Akin, professional baseball player, born in Alma
- Ralph Ely, first settler of Alma and state senator
- Townsend A. Ely, mayor of Alma and state senator
- Peter Gizzi, poet, born in Alma
- Dan Goggin, actor and writer (Nunsense)
- Louisa Boyd Yeomans King, gardener and author; lived c. 1902–1927
- Betty Mahmoody, author of Not Without My Daughter; born in Alma
- Kevin Puts, composer, winner of the 2012 Pulitzer Prize for Music, the 2023 Grammy Award for Best Contemporary Classical Composition, and Musical America's Composer of the Year in 2024; grew up in Alma
- Ralph Rapson, modernist architect; born in Alma
- Mitchell L.R. Walker, aerospace engineer and academic

== Climate ==
This climatic region is typified by large seasonal temperature differences, with warm to hot (and often humid) summers and cold (sometimes severely cold) winters. According to the Köppen Climate Classification system, Alma has a humid continental climate, abbreviated "Dfa" on climate maps.

Climate data for Alma, Michigan (1991–2020 normals, extremes 1887–present)
Month	Jan	Feb	Mar	Apr	May	Jun	Jul	Aug	Sep	Oct	Nov	Dec	Year
Record high °F (°C)	64 (18)	67 (19)	86 (30)	89 (32)	94 (34)	100 (38)	108 (42)	102 (39)	98 (37)	90 (32)	82 (28)	68 (20)	108 (42)
Mean daily maximum °F (°C)	29.1 (−1.6)	32.0 (0.0)	42.6 (5.9)	55.9 (13.3)	68.5 (20.3)	78.1 (25.6)	82.2 (27.9)	80.1 (26.7)	72.9 (22.7)	60.0 (15.6)	45.8 (7.7)	34.5 (1.4)	56.8 (13.8)
Daily mean °F (°C)	22.0 (−5.6)	23.7 (−4.6)	33.0 (0.6)	45.2 (7.3)	57.0 (13.9)	66.9 (19.4)	70.8 (21.6)	69.0 (20.6)	61.3 (16.3)	49.7 (9.8)	37.7 (3.2)	28.2 (−2.1)	47.0 (8.3)
Mean daily minimum °F (°C)	15.0 (−9.4)	15.4 (−9.2)	23.4 (−4.8)	34.5 (1.4)	45.6 (7.6)	55.6 (13.1)	59.3 (15.2)	57.8 (14.3)	49.7 (9.8)	39.4 (4.1)	29.7 (−1.3)	21.9 (−5.6)	37.3 (2.9)
Record low °F (°C)	−24 (−31)	−29 (−34)	−18 (−28)	5 (−15)	20 (−7)	33 (1)	37 (3)	30 (−1)	24 (−4)	12 (−11)	−6 (−21)	−14 (−26)	−29 (−34)
Average precipitation inches (mm)	2.17 (55)	1.76 (45)	2.10 (53)	3.46 (88)	3.73 (95)	3.64 (92)	3.26 (83)	3.71 (94)	2.73 (69)	3.24 (82)	2.66 (68)	2.04 (52)	34.50 (876)
Average snowfall inches (cm)	10.7 (27)	9.9 (25)	5.4 (14)	2.1 (5.3)	0.0 (0.0)	0.0 (0.0)	0.0 (0.0)	0.0 (0.0)	0.0 (0.0)	0.3 (0.76)	2.7 (6.9)	8.2 (21)	39.3 (100)
Average precipitation days (≥ 0.01 in)	12.5	9.9	9.3	11.9	12.0	10.5	10.1	10.1	9.7	12.0	11.3	11.9	131.2
Average snowy days (≥ 0.1 in)	8.1	6.5	3.4	1.4	0.0	0.0	0.0	0.0	0.0	0.1	1.7	6.0	27.2
Source: NOAA

== See also ==
- Alma College
- Alma High School
