= WKHQ-FM =

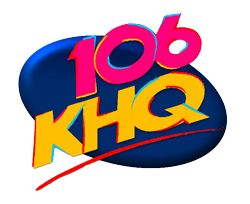
- Charlevoix, Michigan; United States
- Broadcast area: Traverse City-Petoskey
- Frequency: 105.9 MHz
- Branding: Hits 106 KHQ

Programming
- Format: Top 40 (CHR)
- Affiliations: Premiere Networks

Ownership
- Owner: MacDonald Garber Broadcasting; (MacDonald Garber Broadcasting, Inc.)
- Sister stations: WATT, WKAD, WLXT, WLXV, WMKT, WMBN, WZTC

History
- First air date: May 8, 1980
- Former call signs: WKHQ (5/8/80-4/8/85)
- Call sign meaning: Inspired by the KHQ stations of Spokane, Washington

Technical information
- Facility ID: 214
- Class: C1
- ERP: 100,000 watts
- HAAT: 272 meters
- Transmitter coordinates: 45°10′49″N 85°05′50″W

Links
- Webcast: Listen Live
- Website: 106khq.com

WKHQ-FM (105.9 MHz) is a 100,000-watt radio station licensed to Charlevoix, Michigan, with studios located on U.S. 131 South Petoskey, Michigan and US 31 Acme, Michigan. The Top 40 (CHR) station is known to listeners as Hits 106 KHQ, Northern Michigan's #1 Hit Music Channel.

== WVOY ==
The station signed on in 1980, but its roots can be traced back to the early 1970s, with the beginning of WVOY, a 5,000-watt daytime-only station at 1270 kHz on the AM dial. WVOY was one of the first all-contemporary-hit-music radio stations in northern Michigan and featured Bill Vogel ("The Captain," formerly of Detroit's WDRQ), John Yaroch, Rick Durkin, and other major-market-quality talent.

Despite WVOY's limited signal, the station became extremely popular and gave northern Michigan listeners a taste of the "big city" radio sound. The station was live during morning and afternoon drive (with Vogel and Yaroch), and "live assist" automation using ITC ("The Cart Machine People") "carousels" and carted music during other time periods.

== WKHQ Signs On ==
After many years of expensive and time-consuming legal wrangling over a hotly contested 100 kW FM license (mostly with religious broadcast proponent Roland Cilke), the station's owners, Tim Ives and Elmo Franklin, sold an interest to former WVOY salesperson and air talent Tim Moore, who had worked with TM Programming Broadcast consultants in the interim since his departure from WVOY in the mid-1970s. Moore later purchased the interests of Ives and Franklin at a pre-arranged contract price. Tim went on to buy stations in Florida. Today Moore is the principal of Audience Development Group, a large programming consulting firm working with stations coast to coast.

The call letters Moore chose were WKHQ, named after a legendary Spokane, Washington radio and TV combo, KHQ. The station signed on May 8, 1980, using TM Programming's "Stereo Rock" format, developed by George Burns and programmed by Bob Harper. 106/KHQ quickly shot up to the top of the ratings thanks to its polished jocks and pitch-perfect upbeat music. In its early years, WKHQ was known as "The Rhythm of the Northwest" (referring, of course, to northwestern Michigan), and its TM "Stereo Rock" jingles used that slogan. WVOY, in the meantime, flipped to a Music of Your Life format, although the station would return to simulcasting the FM later in the 1980s as WKHQ. The station is now WMKT, "News/Talk 1270."

Moore sold the station in the mid-1980s to Midwest Family, only to recover it a few years later. He sold it again to Cadillac Media who also ended up having financial problems, and again became the owner. Midwest then sold to MacDonald Broadcasting in 1994.

== WKHQ vs. WKPK ==
In 1994, KHQ and 1270, now Talk station WMKT, was sold to Trish MacDonald-Garber, who owned WMBN 1340 and WLXT 96.3, a.k.a. Lite 96. With the ownership change, MacDonald-Garber transitioned KHQ to more of a Hot AC, causing rival 106.7 The Peak to boost their teenage audience even further. KHQ's liners would blast The Peak for being "the rap station", while The Peak's liners would blast KHQ for being too corny. As a result, by the late 1990s, KHQ would be a full-blown CHR again, but in the interim, WKPK became the dominant CHR signal and the #1 station in most areas that KHQ had once "owned".

In 2000, 106.7 The Peak flipped to Hot AC, leaving KHQ all to itself in the CHR arena. With the format all to itself, KHQ again ventured into Adult CHR territory, with only a limited number of rap tracks.

The station's most-recognized personality was long-running morning man Bill "The Captain" Vogel, who hosted the station's morning show from 1983 to 2001 (and had worked at KHQ's predecessor, WVOY-AM, before that). While at KHQ, Vogel was known for his on-air signature catchphrase "Get the heck outta bed!". Vogel left KHQ in 2001 to focus on being a talk radio host on the Michigan Talk Radio Network (MTRN), only to quit due to the network's money troubles. He owned a successful voice-over business, where he produced network spots for CBS and was the announcer for the FOX sketch comedy show Mad TV. Vogel died on March 27, 2021, after a long battle with cancer. Original line-up in 1980: Tim Moore-mornings; Mike Daniels-middays; Bob Harper-Operations Mgr. and afternoons; Carey Carlson-nights; John Borders-voice tracked 10p-6a; Bob White-morning news; Cindy Smith-afternoon news. Other personalities in the 1980s: Rob Hazelton, Jim Owen, Chet Jessick, Mark Cage, Mike Sommers and Christopher Knight.In KHQ's first Arbitron Ratings sweep, it was number one across the board and never looked back until Moore and partner Ernie Winn sold the station in 1990. KHQ received visitations from stations from WPLJ New York to 91X San Diego during Moore's first 5 years of ownership. That led to Moore's programming consultancy, which became Audience Development Group.

The departure of the Captain would be the start of many defections by high-profile personalities, including "Storm" Kennedy, Keith Michaels, Lisa Knight, and Ron Pritchard, who programmed the station for most of the late 1990s through the mid-2000s.

== WKHQ Today ==
Today, WKHQ is still Northern Michigan's #1 rated CHR station

Current voice over talent is Chad Erickson, who replaced Randy Cox in April 2019. Randy Cox was the voice talent of the station after the passing of longtime voice artist Brian James.

On Sunday, March 30th, 2025, WKHQ's 630 foot tower collapsed due to a severe ice storm that hit northern Michigan taking the station offline. The tower is located on Dutchman’s Bay Road, close to Behling Road, Wilson Township, just outside East Jordan

After broadcasting at reduced power from sister-station WSRT's tower location in Elmira following the ice storm, WKHQ is once again broadcasting live from their Dutchman's Bay Road location with a new tower and antenna as of October 22nd, 2026.

== Jingles ==
WKHQ used two jingle packages from JAM Creative Productions (Skywave and Breakthrough) with a HLC package prior to its switch to JAM. However, on May 17, 2009, the station began to use ReelWorld One CHR with the Kiss L.A logo.

In January 2013, WKHQ revamped its image completely, dropping jingles all together in favor of using sweepers and liners.

April 2019 saw the return of Jingles to the station, again utilizing the Kiss LA Logo from Reelworld.

== Competition ==
After WJZQ (Z-93) left the CHR format in February 2023 to switch to Hot Adult Contemporary, WKHQ stands as the only CHR station left in Northern Michigan as of 2026.

== Sources ==
- https://www.allaccess.com All Access - Industry Directory
- https://www.106khq.com
- https://www.linkedin.com/public-profile/in/robbybridges?challengeId=AQEjJHJjxT3EhQAAAXeqlcPFgKe9D7JFFJaet8VjHgicWrA36BD3J6oLwiCrWqIlJnOoKHRogU3nBZD2Yql8tTcrR3YnSfvahw&submissionId=627edba7-ab36-6416-ebdd-30ad7fe77471
