= WLDR-FM =

Coordinates: 44.770°N 85.695°W

Currenntly Silent
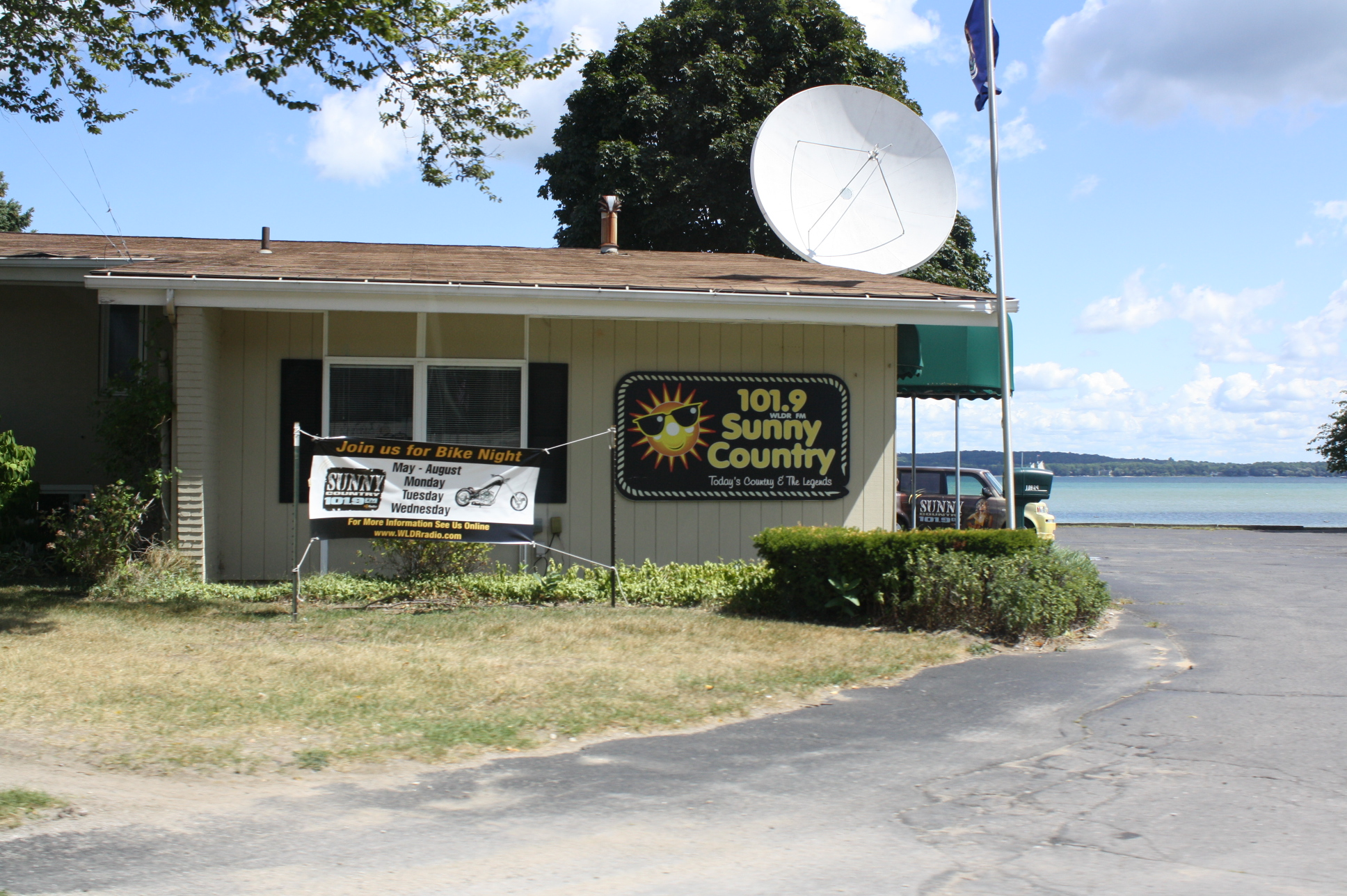
- WLDR studios
- Traverse City, Michigan; United States
- Broadcast area: Traverse City, Michigan
- Frequency: 101.9 MHz (HD Radio)
- Branding: Classic 101.9 FM

Programming
- Format: Oldies

Ownership
- Owner: Roy E. Henderson; (N Content Marketing, LLC)

History
- First air date: July 17, 1966
- Former call signs: WLDR (1966–2001)
- Call sign meaning: Long Distance Radio

Technical information
- Licensing authority: FCC
- Facility ID: 24974
- Class: C1
- ERP: 100,000 watts
- HAAT: 192 meters (630 ft)

Links
- Public license information: Public file; LMS

WLDR-FM (101.9 FM) is a radio station in Traverse City, Michigan, owned by broadcaster Roy Henderson, who is WLDR's third owner in its 53-year history.

== History ==
WLDR-FM signed on in 1966 by Rod Maxson, a well-known businessman in Traverse City along with Robert L. Greaige who was the one with the knowledge of the radio business. Maxson was the owner of Grand Traverse Auto, the city's Ford dealership. With the exception of the nine years in which they played country, WLDR carried some sort of adult contemporary format for its first 38 years, and today. The station's call letters stood for "Long Distance Radio", suitable since they broadcast at 100 kW.

In 1972, Maxson sold a majority of WLDR to one of his salesmen, Don Wiitala, who owned the station for more than 30 years. WLDR was a station that has many aspects of many full-service stations; the station, although licensed to broadcast 24 hours, signed on in the morning and signed off at night, aired local high school sporting events, had a "tradio" show – Wiitala even sold his old house on the show – and played music Wiitala found suitable for his audience.

Maxson also sold a minority of WLDR to his son, Dave Maxson, who served as the station's news director until he decided to work for the Reynolds-Jonkhoff Funeral Home. He remains with WLDR to this day though he sold his stake in the station years ago. Rod died in 2005.

Throughout the 1970s, WLDR was coined "Stereo 102". Some say that Wiitala was frugal in the way he ran WLDR; he would go to the local Giantway (a now-defunct grocery/retail outlet with a chain of stores in central and northern Michigan) in Traverse City (now Tom's Food Market and Dunham's Sports) and buy 45s cheap off the rack. The same tactics were employed in the purchase of LPs. Only obscure record labels would suffice along with artists from a bygone era. The syndicated John Doremus show aired four hours each day. Northern Michigan's first call-in talk show, "Listen to the Mrs." aired weekday afternoons.

In the 1980s, WLDR changed its name to "Sunny 102" to update the station's image. At the time, it had an adult contemporary music format.

Throughout the 1990s, WLDR was part of a dying breed: one-station owners. Also, in the age of 24-hour formats, the station signed on at 5 a.m. and signed off at 1 a.m. Although the station promoted a 'family-friendly' image, the station would play a few alternative rock artists, such as Red Hot Chili Peppers and U2. However, the station was losing a lot of listeners to Trish MacDonald-Garber's WLXT/Lite 96. Starting in the late 1990s, Wiitala, who was in his sixties, was taking offers for WLDR. In 2000, he sold WLDR to Roy Henderson and his Fort Bend Broadcasting Group, who maintained WLDR's AC format, but changed the station's named from Sunny 102 to Sunny 101.9.

Before he sold WLDR to Henderson, Wiitala allowed WLDR to remain on the air 24 hours, thanks to a new automated hard drive system. The station also started airing the syndicated Delilah show.

When Henderson purchased WLDR, he also purchased several other stations, such as WOUF 92.1 (Beulah), which simulcasts WLDR-FM, WBNZ 99.3 (Frankfort) and WCUZ 100.1 (Bear Lake) with the intention to move the stations closer to Traverse City and boost their power. The move would also allow Henderson to develop new formats for northern Michigan radio, like he did in Texas with his popular "Texas Rebel Radio" format. Because of objections from other broadcasters, many of the moves never happened, although WOUF has moved to 92.3 and boosted power to 50 kW.

=== Changes in 2000: Acquisition of WLDR AM ===
In 2000, Henderson also purchased WLDR (1210 AM) in Kingsley. The station was part of a massive overhaul in the Michigan AM dial when Bell Broadcasting increased the power of its WCHB 1200 in Detroit. In order to do so, it purchased two AMs in the Saginaw area: WKNX 1210 Saginaw (signed on in 1947) and WXOX 1250 Bay City (which had been dark since 1993) and moved WKNX to 1250 (now WJMK) and moved 1210 AM to Kingsley in 1997. However, Bell moved the station's aging transmitter to a toxic waste dump near Kingsley, creating transmission troubles. Bell wanted to sell 1210, now with the call letters WJZZ, because it did not want to broadcast in a smaller market out of its footprint. WJZZ had a full-time automated jazz format, but when Bell sold to Radio One, it decided to keep WJZZ off the air as much as possible with a few short-lived stints as urban oldies. Radio One sold WJZZ to Henderson who renamed the station WLDR-AM for a mere $225,000, despite the fact that it now was the most-powerful AM station in the daytime at 50 kW.

In 2001, Henderson gave 1210 a permanent format as talk from the Michigan Talk Radio Network. For a while, he changed the station's call letters to WWJR after a Sheboygan, Wisconsin station gave them up in December 2001 during a rebrand to WHBZ, which gave the station similar calls to Detroit's WWJ and WJR. The call sign was later changed back to WLDR-AM.

In 2004, Henderson changed WLDR AM from talk to satellite-fed "Country Classics" from Waitt Radio Networks, identifying as "Real Country 1210" (not to be confused with ABC Radio's satellite-delivered format also called "Real Country"). A year later, in 2005, he changed WLDR-FM to country.

WOUF and WCUZ soon began to simulcast each other with an automated "traditional" country format called "The Wolf". It was similar to Texas Rebel Radio, playing everything from Waylon and Willie to some of the most popular alt-country artists of today. "The Wolf" has since disappeared. WOUF (now broadcasting with 50,000 watts at 92.3) and sister station WBNZ 99.3 FM in Frankfort swapped frequencies in July 2009, with WOUF retaining the "Wolf" name on 99.3 but shifting to a rock format while WBNZ's AC format moved to 92.3 as "EZ Rock 92.3." At last report, WCUZ was simulcasting 99.3 WOUF.

Henderson traded WLDR AM to Stone Communications in exchange for WWKK (750 AM) in Petoskey, Michigan. AM 1210 is now WJNL and simulcasts with Stone Communications' 1110 WJML. WWKK took on the WLDR call letters and dropped its talk format to simulcast WLDR-FM. The station has since changed calls to WARD but continued simulcasting WLDR-FM. Much of WLDR-FM's programming was delivered via satellite using Waitt Radio Networks' "Country Today" format. Sunny Country was also the Traverse City area affiliate for University of Michigan sports and Traverse City Beach Bums baseball.

On October 22, 2014, WLDR-FM, WARD and WBNZ changed to AC, as 101.9 The Bay. However, shortly after the station's re-launch, a frozen water pipe burst in the station's studios and offices, causing the stations to fall silent for two weeks. Station management submitted a request for special temporary authority (STA) to the U.S. Federal Communications Commission (FCC) to state that WCUZ, WBNZ and WOUF were to remain silent until repairs were made.

=== LMA with Blarney Stone ===
On October 1, 2018, Henderson entered a local marketing agreement (LMA) with Grayling-based Blarney Stone Broadcasting. Along with the new agreement came a rebranding, with the station dropping The Bay branding and rebranded as 101.9 WLDR.

Under the LMA with Blarney Stone, Henderson's WOUF in Beulah began simulcasting WQON in Grayling. WOUF's call letters were subsequently changed to WQAN. Meanwhile, WBNZ in Frankfort flipped to a sports talk simulcast of Blarney Stone's WGRY-FM in Roscommon branded as Up North Sports Radio.

In mid-October 2019 WLDR went silent, after Henderson sued Blarney Stone and the LMA ended; Blarney Stone moved the adult contemporary format to WYPV and WWMN as "North-FM" on November 7. The station has since held a silent STA with the FCC since April 17, 2023, but the license has not been cancelled as of 2026.

== HD Radio ==
In 2008, WLDR-FM became the first northern Michigan radio station to broadcast in HD Radio. As of August 2013, WLDR's HD Radio channel lineup was:

- WLDR-HD1: simulcast of analog programming with slight delay
- WLDR-HD2: Smooth jazz as "The Vineyard" (airing the "Smooth Jazz Network" programming from Broadcast Architecture)
- WLDR-HD3: Good Time Oldies
- WLDR-HD4: simulcast of WQON 100.3

== Sources ==
- Michiguide.com - WLDR-FM History
