= WGRY =

WGRY may refer to:

- WGRY-FM, a radio station (101.1 FM) licensed to serve Roscommon, Michigan, United States
- WMQU, a radio station (1230 AM) licensed to serve Grayling, Michigan, which held the call sign WGRY from 1970 to 2016
- WQON, a radio station (100.3 FM) licensed to serve Grayling, Michigan, which held the call sign WGRY-FM from 1994 to 2013
