= WKLA =

WKLA may refer to:

- WKLA (AM), a radio station (1450 AM) licensed to serve Ludington, Michigan, United States
- WKLA-FM, a radio station (96.3 FM) licensed to serve Ludington, Michigan
- WJML (FM), a radio station (106.3 FM) licensed to serve Ludington, Michigan, which held the call sign WKLA-FM from 1971 to 2016
