= WOUF =

WOUF may refer to:

- WOUF (AM), a radio station (750 AM) licensed to serve Petoskey, Michigan, United States
- WOUF (FM), a defunct radio station (100.1 FM) formerly licensed to serve Bear Lake, Michigan
- WLLS, a radio station (99.3 FM) licensed to serve Beulah, Michigan, which held the call sign WOUF from 2009 to 2018
