= WJML =

WJML may refer to:

- WJML (FM), a radio station (106.3 FM) licensed to serve Thompsonville, Michigan, United States
- WWMN (AM), a radio station (1110 AM) licensed to Petoskey, Michigan, which held the call sign WJML from 1966 to 2024
- WAWM (FM), a radio station (98.9 FM) licensed to Petoskey, Michigan, which held the call signs WJML and WJML-FM from 1965 to 1991
