= WBNZ =

Coordinates: 44.611°N 86.161°W

- Frankfort, Michigan; United States
- Frequency: 92.3 MHz
- Branding: 92.3 WBNZ

Programming
- Format: Defunct (was Active rock)

Ownership
- Owner: Roy E Henderson

History
- First air date: 1994 (as WRQT at 92.1)
- Last air date: April 15, 2023
- Former call signs: WRQT (1994–1996); WBVE (1996–1999); WSRI (1999–2001); WOUF (2001–2009)
- Former frequencies: 92.1 MHz (1994–2009)
- Call sign meaning: Benzie County

Technical information
- Licensing authority: FCC
- Facility ID: 57414
- Class: C2
- ERP: 50,000 watts
- HAAT: 136 meters (446 ft)

Links
- Public license information: Public file; LMS

WBNZ (92.3 FM) was a radio station licensed to Frankfort, Michigan. The station was owned by Roy E Henderson.

== History ==
WBNZ first went on the air in October 1978 with a soft rock and local news format. The general manager was Michael Bradford, a former DJ at WCCW in Traverse City. It had live DJs, including Bradford for the local morning show, with a pre-recorded music format and local news. Network news was broadcast hourly from the ABC FM Network.

In July 2009, WOUF (92.3 FM) in Beulah and WBNZ (99.3 FM) in Frankfort swapped call signs and cities of license, with WBNZ's soft AC format moving to 92.3 and WOUF ("The Wolf") taking residence on 99.3 with a new format (changing from a country/southern rock hybrid to mainstream rock). The 92.3 license, which formerly operated at 92.1 FM, had aired a variety of formats since first taking to the air in the mid-1990s, including simulcasts of WBNZ and WLDR-FM, and an 1980s hits format as WSRI "Star FM", simulcast with WSRQ (100.1 FM).

On October 22, 2014, WBNZ began simulcasting WLDR-FM as "The Bay". On January 21, 2015, WBNZ went silent. In early to mid July 2016, WBNZ was heard on the air with a simulcast of WLDR-FM, likely as a way to keep the license active. Throughout October 2016, the station was on and off the air again, still simulcasting The Bay. On October 1, 2018, WBNZ switched from a simulcast with WLDR-FM to a simulcast of sports-formatted WGRY-FM.

In October 2019 WBNZ went silent. The station went silent again on April 15, 2023. The Federal Communications Commission canceled the station's license in September 2026, as it had been off the air for over a year.
