= WWMN =

WWMN may refer to:

- WWMN (AM), a radio station (1110 AM) licensed to Petoskey, Michigan, United States
- WJML (FM), a radio station (106.3 FM) licensed to serve Thompsonville, Michigan, which held the call sign WWMN from 2016 to 2024
- WWCK (AM), a radio station (1570 AM) licensed to Flint, Michigan, which held the call sign WWMN from 1981 to 1984
