= WKNX =

WKNX may refer to:

- WKNX-TV, a television station (channel 7) licensed to serve Knoxville, Tennessee, United States
- WEYI-TV, a television station (channel 25) licensed to serve Saginaw, Michigan, United States, which held the call sign WKNX-TV from 1953 to 1972
- WJMK (AM), a radio station (1250 AM) licensed to Bridgeport, Michigan, which held the call sign WKNX from 1997 to 2004
- WJNL, a radio station (1210 AM) which held the call sign WKNX from 1947 to 1997, while it was licensed to Saginaw, Michigan
