= WMLQ =

Radio station in Manistee, Michigan

Coordinates: 44.211°N 86.298°W

- Manistee, Michigan; United States
- Broadcast area
- Frequency: 97.7 MHz
- Branding: News 97 & 98

Programming
- Format: News/Talk (WLDN simulcast)

Ownership
- Owner: Todd Mohr; (Synergy Lakeshore Licenses, LLC)
- Sister stations: WKLA, WKLA-FM, WKZC, WLDN, WWKR

History
- First air date: 1970 (as WMTE-FM)
- Former call signs: WVXM (1/17/95-6/1/06); WMTE-FM (3/25/91-1/17/95); WRRK (1980s-3/25/91); WMTE-FM (1970-1980s)

Technical information
- Licensing authority: FCC
- Facility ID: 39787
- Class: A
- ERP: 2,500 watts
- HAAT: 157 meters

Links
- Public license information: Public file; LMS

WMLQ (97.7 FM, "News 97 & 98") is a radio station located in Manistee, Michigan broadcasting a news/talk format, simulcasting WLDN 98.7 FM Ludington.

The station began broadcasting in 1970 under the WMTE-FM call sign (the current WMTE-FM, at 101.5, is unrelated, but was a sister station of WMLQ for a short time in 2012 and 2013). In the 1980s, the station was WRRK, playing Top 40 music. From 1995 to 2006, the station simulcast WVXU in Cincinnati, Ohio as WVXM, an affiliate of the "X-Star Radio Network," which featured a variety of programs, including news, talk, jazz, and adult standards.

After WVXU was sold to the owners of classical station WGUC in Cincinnati, all of WVXA's former repeater stations were sold off to other owners; 97.7 FM was purchased by Synergy Media, owners of classic rock station WWKR in Hart, Michigan. Synergy Media has installed a commercial Soft AC/Oldies/Easy Listening format on 97.7 FM as "The Coast."

The WMLQ calls were formerly used in the 1980s and 1990s at an FM station in Rogers City, Michigan, which coincidentally also operated on the 97.7 FM frequency (it later moved to 96.7) and also played an AC format, under the name "Mello-Q." Also coincidentally, the original WMLQ in Rogers City later became WVXA, also an X-Star Radio Network affiliate; it is now WRGZ and simulcasts WATZ-FM, a commercial country music station in Alpena, Michigan.

On February 1, 2016, WMLQ switched to a simulcast of news/talk-formatted WLDN 98.7 FM Ludington. The "Coast FM" format is now heard on 101.5 WMTE-FM.

The station airs The Steve Gruber Show, the flagship program for The Michigan Talk Network, on delay, in late mornings.
