= WMTE-FM =

Radio station in Manistee, Michigan

Coordinates: 44.211°N 86.298°W

- Manistee, Michigan; United States
- Broadcast area
- Frequency: 101.5 MHz
- Branding: Eagle 101.5

Programming
- Format: Adult hits
- Affiliations: ABC News Radio; United Stations Radio Networks

Ownership
- Owner: Bryan Hollenbaugh; (45 North Media Inc)
- Sister stations: WMJZ-FM

History
- First air date: June 24, 1994 (as WXYQ)
- Former call signs: WXYQ (7/8/92-9/8/00)
- Call sign meaning: ManisTEe, Michigan

Technical information
- Licensing authority: FCC
- Facility ID: 4109
- Class: A
- ERP: 6,000 watts
- HAAT: 100 meters

Links
- Public license information: Public file; LMS
- Webcast: Listen Live
- Website: eagle1015.com

WMTE-FM (101.5 MHz) is a radio station located in Manistee, Michigan, United States, and owned by 45 North Media, Inc. WMTE-FM airs an adult hits format and positions itself as Uniquely Northern Michigan.

== History ==
The station was signed on in June 1994 by the original owner, Bay View Broadcasting. The original call letters were WXYQ and the station adopted an oldies format. Those call letters were previously used by an AM country station in Stevens Point, Wisconsin. WXYQ was sold to Crystal Clear Communications for $200,000.00 in January, 1997. When new stations arrived in 1999, the new FCC rules allowed WXYQ to be consolidated into the Lake Michigan Broadcasting Group. When the FCC transfer was approved for $380,000.00 in 2000, Lake Michigan Broadcasting changed the call letters. The new call signs became WMTE-FM to reflect the co-ownership of its existing AM station WMTE.

WMTE-FM adjusted its format from oldies to classic hits and took on the name "Kool 101-5," replacing "Oldies 101.5."

In July 2012, WMTE-FM dropped classic hits and returned to its previous oldies format, this time using Cumulus Media's True Oldies Channel format. On July 23, 2013, Lake Michigan Broadcasting filed to sell the station to Del Reynolds, for $1,000. The sale was consummated on December 19, 2013. On December 19, 2013, WMTE-FM went silent. On Sept. 23, 2015, AllAccess.com reported that Reynolds sold WMTE-FM to Mitten Media LLC for $1,000. The sale was consummated on January 21, 2016.

On February 1, 2016, WMTE-FM returned to the air with a soft AC format, branded as "Coast FM 101.5". The format moved from WMLQ 97.7 FM, which at that time became a simulcast of 98.7 WLDN. During the month of September 2017, the station switched to a simulcast of an album adult alternative from WWMN in Traverse City. On April 2, 2018, WMTE-FM dropped it simulcast with WWMN, continuing with the "Mitten" adult album alternative format.

On November 1, 2018, Mitten Media accepted an asset purchase agreement with 45 North Media Inc, who assumed daily operation of the station. On November 12, 2018, the station flipped format to the moniker "Eagle 101.5"; repositioning itself as an Adults Hits format. The final purchase was granted and consummated on February 10, 2020.

The station features a complement of on-air personalities, including longtime area personality Scotty Mac hosting mornings (6-10 am); Bryan in midday (10 am-3 pm) and Mike Reling hosting afternoons (3-8 pm). Eagle 101.5 also features a locally produced outdoors programs to include Big Boys Radio, on Saturday morning, and Michigan Rocks!, hosted by Mark Sandstedt Saturday evenings. Other specialty programs include New Wave Nation, Retro Mix, Time Warp, along with the regionally produced Acoustic Cafe, hosted by Rob Reinhart.

45 North Media Inc owns another Northern Michigan station, WMJZ-FM, in nearby Gaylord.
