= WWKR =

Coordinates: 43.676°N 86.239°W

- Hart, Michigan; United States
- Broadcast area
- Frequency: 94.1 MHz
- Branding: West Michigan's 94 K-Rock

Programming
- Format: Classic rock
- Affiliations: Jones Radio Networks "Rock Classics"

Ownership
- Owner: Todd Mohr; (Synergy Lakeshore Licenses, LLC)
- Sister stations: WKLA, WKLA-FM, WKZC, WLDN, WMLQ

History
- First air date: 1 July 1995 (as WEWM)
- Former call signs: WEWM (4/18/95-4/20/98)
- Call sign meaning: WW K-Rock

Technical information
- Licensing authority: FCC
- Facility ID: 7994
- Class: C3
- ERP: 5,000 watts
- HAAT: 208 meters

Links
- Public license information: Public file; LMS

WWKR (94.1 FM, "K-Rock") is a radio station in Hart, Michigan, broadcasting a classic rock format. The station airs the satellite-fed "Rock Classics" format (a.k.a. "The Classic Rock Station") from Jones Radio Networks.

== History ==
The station began broadcasting in 1995 as WEWM in Pentwater, Michigan, with a satellite-fed smooth jazz format from Jones. The current format and calls were adopted in 1998. When 105.3 FM WCXT moved from Hart to Coopersville to become a Grand Rapids market station (see WHTS), WWKR changed its city of license to Hart to retain local radio service to the community of Hart, with no change in power or antenna pattern. Pentwater retains city-grade local radio service via 102.7 WMOM. A few years after WCXT/WHTS moved to Coopersville, WWKR moved its transmitter to WCXT's old tower east of Hart in order to improve its signal into Muskegon. It can be heard as far south as Hudsonville and as far north as Benzonia.
