= WOUF (AM) =

- Petoskey, Michigan; United States
- Frequency: 750 kHz
- Branding: Memories FM

Programming
- Format: Easy listening

Ownership
- Owner: Suzanne Henderson; (N Content Marketing, LLC)

History
- First air date: June 2000
- Last air date: April 2023
- Former call signs: WJNL (1996–1999); WWKK (1999–2007); WLDR (2007–2008); WARD (2008–2021)

Technical information
- Licensing authority: FCC
- Facility ID: 79338
- Class: B
- Power: 1,000 watts day; 330 watts night
- Transmitter coordinates: 45.335°N 84.926°W

Links
- Public license information: Public file; LMS

WOUF (750 AM) was a radio station licensed to Petoskey, Michigan, and was owned by Suzanne Henderson through N Content Marketing, LLC. The station operated from 2000 to 2023.

== History ==
The station began broadcasting in June 2000, holding the call sign WWKK, and aired an oldies format with programming from Westwood One. The station was branded "Kool 750", and was owned by Stone Communications. In 2002, WWKK's weekday programming was changed to talk; the station retained the "Kool 750" branding. In 2007, Stone Communications exchanged the station for 1210 WLDR in Kingsley, Michigan, with Roy Henderson's Fort Bend Broadcasting taking ownership of 750 WWKK and a payment of $244,000 in cash. In April 2007, the station's format was changed to country music, in a simulcast with WLDR-FM. In May 2007, the station's call sign was changed to WLDR. In 2008, the station's call sign was changed to WARD, which was named after Roy Henderson's son. In 2014, WARD and WLDR-FM adopted an adult contemporary format.

In mid-October 2019, WARD went silent. The callsign was changed to WOUF, previously used on two other Northern Michigan stations, on November 9, 2021.

WOUF again left the air in April 2023 due to financial difficulties. The Federal Communications Commission cancelled the station’s license on December 4, 2024.
