= WKLA (AM) =

Coordinates: 43°57′05″N 86°25′28″W

- Ludington, Michigan; United States
- Frequency: 1450 kHz
- Branding: Oldies 1450/106.3

Programming
- Format: Oldies
- Affiliations: Westwood One

Ownership
- Owner: Todd Mohr; (Synergy Media, Inc.)
- Sister stations: WKLA-FM, WKZC, WLDN, WMLQ, WWKR

History
- First air date: October 8, 1944
- Call sign meaning: Karl L. Ashbacker

Technical information
- Licensing authority: FCC
- Facility ID: 10810
- Class: C
- Power: 1,000 watts
- Translators: 92.7 W224CA (Ludington); 106.3 W292FE (Luddington)

Links
- Public license information: Public file; LMS

WKLA is an AM radio station owned by Todd Mohr, through licensee Synergy Media, Inc. It broadcasts from Ludington, Michigan. It airs Westwood One's Good Time Oldies format and can be heard in a very small area around Ludington and Scottville.

In late 2013 and early 2014, WKLA added two FM translators to extend its reach, 92.7 W224CA in Ludington (formerly a rebroadcaster of sister station WWKR) and 107.9 W300CG in Manistee (which has since moved to a different frequency and is simulcasting WKLA's sister station WMLQ). 92.7 covers a larger coverage area than 1450 AM. WKLA is also the home of Manistee Chippewas football and basketball despite the 1450 signal not reaching Manistee itself.

As of September 2016, the station is airing the news/talk programming of sister station WLDN 98.7 FM on an assumed temporary basis pending retuning and installation of a new antenna for WLDN, as the latter's previous antenna was used to put WKLA-FM on the air on 96.3. In February 2017, WLDN returned to the air on 98.7 FM, allowing WKLA and W224CA to resume the oldies format.

== History ==
The AM station went on the air on October 8, 1944, originally housed on the second floor of the Masonic Temple in downtown Ludington. Karl L. Ashbacher was the original owner, with his initials being the original basis for the call letters. Previously the family had operated WKBZ in Ludington from 1926 to 1934, moving it to Muskegon, Michigan in the latter year. In 1945 the WKLA studio moved to the Ludington Chamber of Commerce office at 204 E. Ludington Avenue. Raymond A. Plank purchased the station in 1949. In 1951, the station was moved to its current site at 5941 W. US 10 in Ludington. In 1971, WKLA expanded its programming with WKLA-FM.

Programming on WKLA for many years consisted of full service MOR programming and adult standards. WKLA-FM spent much of its programming day simulcasting the AM signal before introducing a separate adult contemporary format around 1980, which it has retained since. Talk programming was introduced in the late 1990s, and the station soon went all talk prior to the switch to oldies in 2010.

Other past owners of WKLA include Tom Plank and Chickering & Associates. In 1996, the station was purchased by Roger Baerwolf under the corporate name of Lake Michigan Broadcasting, Inc. Until July 2012, the company owned and operated WKLA AM/FM, WMTE AM/FM (Manistee) and WKZC-FM (Scottville).

In June 2012, it was announced that Lake Michigan Broadcasting was selling all of its Ludington/Manistee stations to Synergy Media, which already owned and operated WWKR in Hart and WMLQ in Manistee. Synergy assumed control of the stations the following month and began simulcasting WKLA's programming on WMTE-FM. On June 19, 2013, the licenses involved were transferred to Synergy Media at a price of $580,000.

Former translator W300CG now operates on 107.7 FM as W299CB, rebroadcasting sister station WWMN.

== Previous logo ==
(WKLA's logo under previous talk format)
