= WLLS =

Coordinates: 44.611°N 86.161°W

- Beulah, Michigan; United States
- Broadcast area
- Frequency: 99.3 MHz

Programming
- Format: Defunct

Ownership
- Owner: Roy E. Henderson; (N Content Marketing, LLC)
- Sister stations: WLDR-FM; WBNZ

History
- First air date: October 2, 1979 (as WBNZ)
- Last air date: 2023
- Former call signs: WBNZ (1978–2009); WOUF (2009–2018); WQAN (2018–2020)

Technical information
- Licensing authority: FCC
- Facility ID: 14646
- Class: C2
- ERP: 50,000 watts
- HAAT: 125 meters (410 ft)

Links
- Public license information: Public file; LMS

WLLS (99.3 FM) was a radio station in Beulah, Michigan. The station, which began broadcasting in 1979, was owned by Traverse City broadcaster Roy E. Henderson under the "N Content Marketing" banner and was long the primary local station for the Frankfort area and Benzie County. It was formerly simulcast on WCUZ 100.1 FM licensed to Bear Lake, Michigan.

WLLS's coverage area did not extend far east of Traverse City and Cadillac to protect co-channel WATZ-FM in Alpena, but the station could be heard across Lake Michigan in parts of northeastern Wisconsin.

== History ==
The station was originally WBNZ, which aired some kind of adult contemporary or hot AC music format for many years. WBNZ was also heavily involved in the Frankfort and Benzie County community, with local news and high-school sports coverage.

In July 2009, the WBNZ call sign moved to 92.3 (formerly WOUF on 92.1) and the 99.3 allotment became WOUF "99.3 The Wolf", which aired a mainstream rock format mixing new and classic rock. The station's competition included Northern Radio's classic rocker WKLT (which Henderson founded but sold off in the 1980s) and Northern Star Broadcasting's classic rock WGFN "The Bear" and mainstream rocker WJZJ ("Real Rock"). WOUF retained its city of license of Beulah with the move to 99.3, and WBNZ retained its city of license of Frankfort with the move to 92.3.

On January 21, 2015, WOUF went silent. On January 26, 2017, WOUF returned to the air with a simulcast of adult contemporary-formatted WLDR-FM as "The Bay".

On September 30, 2018, WOUF changed its call sign to WQAN. On October 1, 2018, WQAN switched from a simulcast of WLDR-FM to a simulcast of album-oriented rock-formatted WQON, under a local marketing agreement (LMA) with Blarney Stone Broadcasting. A Federal Communications Commission (FCC) agent found WQAN broadcasting from an unauthorized location on June 18, 2019. In October 2019, WQAN again went silent, after Henderson sued Blarney Stone and the LMA was terminated.

On October 1, 2020, WQAN changed its call letters to WLLS. The FCC canceled the station's license in September 2026, as it had been off the air for over a year.
