= WMJZ-FM =

Coordinates: 45.019°N 84.408°W

- Gaylord, Michigan; United States
- Broadcast area: Northern Michigan
- Frequency: 101.5 MHz
- Branding: Eagle 101.5

Programming
- Format: Adult hits
- Affiliations: ABC News Radio; United Stations Radio Networks

Ownership
- Owner: Bryan Hollenbaugh; (45 North Media Inc)
- Sister stations: WMTE-FM

History
- First air date: February 20, 1984 (as WZXM-FM at 95.3)
- Former call signs: WZXM-FM (1/11/84-7/13/87); WEGS (4/30/82-1/11/84, CP)
- Former frequencies: 95.3 MHz (1984–1998)
- Call sign meaning: MaJic 95 (previous format)

Technical information
- Licensing authority: FCC
- Facility ID: 11756
- Class: C2
- ERP: 50,000 watts
- HAAT: 150 meters

Links
- Public license information: Public file; LMS
- Webcast: Listen Live
- Website: eagle1015.com

WMJZ-FM (101.5 MHz) is a commercial radio station licensed to the city of Gaylord, Michigan. It broadcasts with a power output of 50,000 watts. The station airs an adult hits format as Eagle 101.5, and is owned by 45 North Media Inc, a company owned by Bryan Hollenbaugh.

== History ==
=== Beginnings ===
For many years, WMJZ operated at the class A frequency of 95.3 FM, and a power output of only 3,000 watts. The station first went on the air on February 20, 1984, as WZXM-FM with a Top 40/CHR format, as the FM sister station of AM 900 WZXM, which had been on the air since 1950, first as WATC, which was originally part of the Paul Bunyan Network. As WZXM was a daytime-only station at this time, the presence of WZXM allowed Otsego County to enjoy local radio service after FCC rules mandated shutdown of the AM station after sunset.

WZXM was sold in June 1986 to a Detroit broadcaster. The call letters were changed to WMJZ as part of an AM and FM simulcast of adult contemporary and oldies music, provided by ABC Radio/SMN's Starstation satellite-delivered format along with a local community involvement.

=== Simulcast abandoned: WMJZ comes into its own ===
Classic Radio decided to end the simulcast between the two stations in 1990, as WMJZ-AM had been granted limited nighttime power by the FCC and had the ability to have its own identity. WMJZ then adopted a satellite-delivered adult contemporary format, while the AM adopted the call letters WSNQ and broadcast a syndicated news/talk format from the Sun Radio Network. In June 1996, Classic Radio, Inc. decided to sell the station to Morning Dove, Inc., a company owned by David and Jo'Anne Essmaker.

Morning Dove made upgrades to the equipment and ended the satellite format relationship over the FM and began a new format of Hot Adult Contemporary music, all programmed locally on-site. The station dropped its "Majic" branding and became known as "Z95." In February 1998, Morning Dove agreed to sell the station to Darby Advertising.

=== Darby Advertising ===
Darby Advertising applied for a construction permit to move WMJZ from 95.3 to 101.5. The FCC approved the application in October 1998. WMJZ moved to 101.5 and was rebilled as "Oldies 101.5", with programming from Jones Radio Networks' Good Time Oldies format and its power now doubled to 6,000 watts.

The FCC granted a request in February 2004 for WMJZ to move its antenna to a taller tower and increase its power to 50,000 watts, covering much of Michigan's northern lower peninsula and Mackinac Straits area. WMJZ also moved tower locations, from a site on the east side of Gaylord along M-32 to a new site north of Vienna Corners, Michigan.

In early 2006, WMJZ ended its oldies format in favor of a classic hits format under the name Eagle 101.5.

=== 45 North Media Inc ===
On January 1, 2018, WMJZ was sold to veteran broadcaster Bryan Hollenbaugh. Hollenbaugh was most recently a general manager at group of radio stations in Albany, New York. The sale was consummated on July 31, 2018, at a price of $750,000.

The station was re-positioned to Adult Hits and 'Uniquely Northern Michigan'. The format of the station became more contemporary, adding titles from the 1990s and 2000s into the mix. Long-time morning show host Mike Reling has been a station staple; having hosted mornings for over 25 years; airing weekdays from 6 to 10 am. Kris Daniels hosts middays from 10am-3pm. Program Director Rob Weaver hosts weekday afternoons 3pm-8pm.

Specialty features, including Eagle on Tap and Live at Five weekdays feature local happenings in the bar and restaurant scene and local musicians performing in studio. Weekend programming consists of locally produced shows Big Boys Radio a local hunting and fishing show on Saturday Mornings; "Michigan Rocks!" hosted by Mark Sandstedt, and Sunday Over Easy an oldies show that airs Sunday Mornings, hosted by station owner Bryan Hollenbaugh; local church services; and the regionally produced Acoustic Cafe, hosted by Rob Reinhart. Other specialty programs include New Wave Nation, Retro Mix and Time Warp.

WMJZ is also an affiliate of ABC News Radio; and airs play-by-play coverage various high school football and basketball games throughout respective seasons for Gaylord High School.

=== WMJZ gains a sister station ===
In November 2018, 45 North Media expanded to the Manistee market, purchasing WMTE-FM from Mitten Media, replacing the station's Adult album alternative format with similar adult hits format as Eagle 101.5. Despite the station's similar branding and identical frequency, WMTE is not a simulcast of WMJZ. Rather, they are independently programmed.

=== 2025 Ice Storm ===
WMJZ and at least four other Northern Michigan radio stations were knocked off the air during an ice storm in March of 2025. The station's 350 foot transmitting tower near Johannesburg, Michigan fell due to high winds and ice accumulation. The station is currently broadcasting with a temporary antenna at the studio building until a new tower can be erected.
