= Benzie County Courthouse =

- U.S. National Register of Historic Places
- Michigan State Historic Site
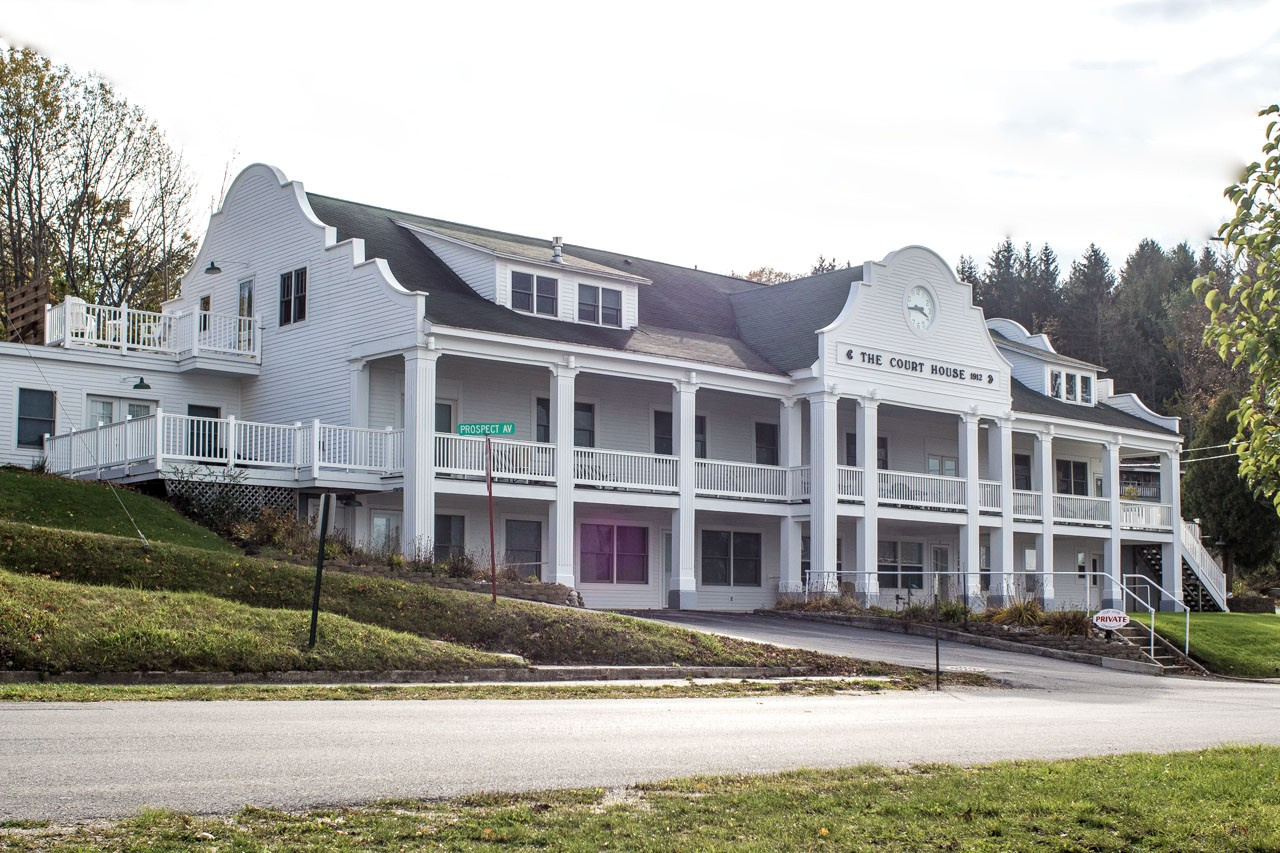
- Building in 2013

- Location within Michigan Location within the United States
- Interactive map showing the location of Benzie County Courthouse
- Location: 7157 Crystal Avenue; Beulah, Michigan
- Coordinates: 44.62752°N 86.09614°W
- Built: 1912
- NRHP reference No.: 96000611

Significant dates
- Added to NRHP: June 3, 1996
- Designated MSHS: February 16, 1989

The Benzie County Courthouse is a historic former courthouse in Beulah, Michigan. It is a Michigan State Historic Site and is listed on the National Register of Historic Places. Built in 1912 as a hotel and recreation center, it later served as a courthouse until 1976.

== History ==
The building was constructed in 1912. It initially served as a recreation center and hotel, named "The Grand". In early 1916, Beulah won an election to become the county seat of Benzie County. The former hotel was converted into a courthouse; the first floor became county offices and the second floor became a courtroom and sheriff's residence. The jail, nicknamed "The County Root Cellar", was a simple concrete box connected to the courthouse's east end. The county courthouse moved into the Beulah location on June 1, 1916.

The courthouse underwent extensive renovations from 1936 through 1938. Benzie County rented the building until 1942 when it purchased the courthouse from Beulah for about $3000. By 1975, the county had raised $615,000 through Federal revenue sharing and the sale of a farm to build a new courthouse. Construction on the new facility began in January 1975, and the courthouse moved out of the historic building in 1976. Since its discontinuation as a courthouse, the building has served a number roles and tenants, including stores, restaurants, an inn, and condominiums. The building was designated a Michigan State Historic Site on February 16, 1989, and listed on the National Register of Historic Places on June 3, 1996.

== Architecture ==
The courthouse features elements of Mission Revival and Spanish Colonial Revival architecture. The building has a clapboard facade and is two stories tall with an attic. The structure features Flemish gables at the sides and the slightly projecting front. A two-story portico with square columns stretches across the front of the building.

== See also ==
- National Register of Historic Places listings in Benzie County, Michigan
- List of Michigan State Historic Sites in Benzie County, Michigan
