= WKZC =

Coordinates: 44.057°N 86.416°W

- Scottville, Michigan; United States
- Frequency: 94.9 MHz
- Branding: The Big Dog 94.9

Programming
- Format: Country
- Affiliations: Michigan IMG Sports Network

Ownership
- Owner: Todd Mohr; (Synergy Media, Inc.)
- Sister stations: WKLA, WKLA-FM, WLDN, WMLQ, WWKR

History
- First air date: February 16, 1983

Technical information
- Licensing authority: FCC
- Facility ID: 10811
- Class: C3
- ERP: 17,000 watts
- HAAT: 122 meters (400 ft)

Links
- Public license information: Public file; LMS

WKZC (94.9 FM) is a United States radio station broadcasting a country music format. Licensed to Scottville, Michigan, the Federal Communications Commission assigned the call letters of WKZC on June 21, 1982. WKZC (KZ 96) took to the air February 16, 1983, as a 3,000-watt station at 95.9 MHz owned by Kathy Ziehm/West Shore Broadcasting. It was initially known as KZ Country, with Ray Cummins as Station Manager. In 1993, the station was purchased by Chickering Associates, bringing it into current ownership with longtime competitors WKLA-AM/FM, and moved to its current frequency. WKZC and the WKLA stations were sold to Lake Michigan Broadcasting in 1996.

WKZC transmits from a 364-foot tower in Mason County's Hamlin Township. The station broadcasts from the Synergy Media studios at 5941 US-10 in Ludington. WKZC operates as "The Big Dog 949" playing country music. In 2012, Lake Michigan Broadcasting sold all of its stations to Synergy Media and Synergy operated the stations from July 1, 2012. On June 19, 2013, the licenses were officially transferred to Synergy Media at a price of $580,000.
