= WMQU =

Coordinates: 44°39′5.1″N 84°44′18.1″W

- Grayling, Michigan; United States
- Broadcast area: Crawford County, Michigan
- Frequency: 1230 kHz
- Branding: Relevant Radio

Programming
- Format: Catholic radio
- Affiliations: Relevant Radio

Ownership
- Owner: Sheryl and Gerald Coyne; (Blarney Stone Broadcasting, Inc.)
- Sister stations: WGRY-FM, WQON

History
- First air date: August 1970 (as WGRY)
- Last air date: February 2024
- Former call signs: WGRY (1970–2016)
- Call sign meaning: "With Mary, Queen of the Universe"

Technical information
- Licensing authority: FCC
- Facility ID: 16830
- Class: C
- Power: 750 watts

Links
- Public license information: Public file; LMS

WMQU (1230 AM) was a radio station which broadcast a Catholic radio format as an affiliate of Relevant Radio. Licensed to Grayling, Michigan, the station was owned and operated by Sheryl & Gerald Coyne, through licensee Blarney Stone Broadcasting, Inc. Blarney Stone also owns WGRY-FM and WQON, co-located at WMQU's broadcast facilities in Grayling.

The station went on the air in 1970 as WGRY, became WMQU in 2016, and ceased operations in 2024.

== History ==
When WGRY went on the air at 1590 AM in August 1970, the staff included co-owners, James Sylvester as Station Manager and Jim Marr as Engineer. The first employee hired was Wayne Andrew Hindmarsh, better known as "Wayne Andrews" on the air, fresh from Wayne State University. The station was licensed to operate from Sunrise to Sunset and operated at 1,000 watts. Later they received pre-sun-rise authorization for 500 watts. Even so, the hours of operation depended on the hours of sunlight. All three men had air shifts as well as their other duties. Within 30 days Wayne Hindmarsh was on the street selling air time. The station was "MOR" better known then as "Middle of the Road". Other programs stressed local News and Sports. From the beginning, WGRY was committed to being involved in community events.

One of the most popular programs was an On-Air Swap Shop where people called in with items to sell or were looking to buy. Representatives from area clubs and organizations were interviewed concerning fund raising activities and other events. Grayling Mercy Hospital held a radio auction that successfully raised thousands of dollars over the air. Little League Baseball games were broadcast tape-delayed as were the Grayling Viking Football and Basketball games. On Saturday there was a live broadcast from the Wag-On-Inn with local celebrity Ed Harris singing and playing country music. Beginning with their first year on the air WGRY covered the Canoe Marathon. Later on there was another very popular local radio personality added to the staff, Viv Nichols. Viv's interview and discussion shows became a "Don't Miss" daily event. Viv proved to be a consummate interviewer with one of her highlights an interview with Gov. William Grawn Milliken.

In October 1977, WGRY was sold to John DeGroot, who also owned WWRM-FM (now WSRT and under different ownership) in Gaylord. Shortly thereafter, Wayne Hindmarsh left WGRY to put his own station WQON on the air. The station management was turned over to William F. Jones. Jones left after a year to teach broadcasting at Specs Howard School of Media Arts in Southfield. Peter Allen was hired as station and sales manager. Rob Weaver replaced Peter two years later and at that time the format for WGRY changed to all country. DJ Brown started in June 1984. By January 1985 she was station manager and vice-president of sales. She was the final manager under John DeGroot and Alpine Broadcasting's ownership.

On September 26, 1988, WGRY was purchased by Gannon Broadcasting Systems, Inc., owned and operated by William S. Gannon. In 1990, the Federal Communications Commission (FCC) granted Gannon Broadcasting approval to construct a new station licensed to Roscommon broadcasting at 101.1 on the FM dial. WGRY-FM made its debut on March 12 of that year at 6,000 watts. At that time, WGRY's frequency changed from 1590 to 1230 kHz on the AM dial. The stations simulcast and did so for many years.

In January 2001, Gannon Broadcasting by this time had acquired its crosstown competitor, WQON-FM. In 1994, WQON and WGRY-FM switched call letters, and the former WQON's frequency moved from 100.1 to 100.3, which also allowed a power increase from 3,000 to 60,000 watts. The new station at 100.3 was then marketed as Y-100, and continued the contemporary country format from the old WGRY-FM. The new WQON, now at 101.1, adopted Jones Radio Network's "Soft Hits" adult contemporary format and the moniker "Decades 101", but continued its AM simulcast with WGRY until this time, when a new format for AM 1230 WGRY was launched - the Music of Your Life.

Until January 2008, WGRY broadcast the Music of Your Life, syndicated via satellite by Jones. In January 2008, Jones stopped syndicating the Music of Your Life format in favor of its own satellite service called "Jones Standards," which featured a similar playlist to Music of Your Life.

WGRY continued on broadcasting Jones Standards until the format was discontinued on September 30, 2008, due to Jones Radio Network having come under the ownership of Triton Media Group, owners of Dial Global. Most of the Jones Standards stations, including WGRY, were switched over to Dial Global's America's Best Music format, which focuses chiefly on MOR hits and soft oldies from the 1960s through the 1980s.

In July 2012, it was announced that WGRY and sister stations WGRY-FM and WQON were being sold by William Gannon to Sheryl and Jerry Coyne (d/b/a Blarney Stone Broadcasting, Inc.). Gannon expressed a desire to get out of the broadcasting business after suffering a stroke in the summer of 2011. No change to any of the stations' formats was planned. The sale was consummated on October 2, 2012, for consideration of $425,000.

On January 14, 2013, WGRY-FM and adult contemporary-formatted sister station WQON 101.1 FM swapped call letters, and the new 100.3 WQON changed its format from country to Rock and Roll, branded as "Q100.3, The Only Place for Rock & Roll". Home of Detroit Lions Football, University of Michigan Football/Basketball and Voice of Grayling Viking High School Sports. On February 18, 2013, WGRY changed its format from adult standards to sports, with programming from CBS Sports Radio.

On January 15, 2016, WGRY changed its call sign to WMQU. On March 1, 2016, WMQU became an affiliate of Baraga Radio based in Traverse City airing Catholic programming. The station is still owned by Blarney Stone Broadcasting but was leased to Baraga for seven years, and was planned to be donated outright to Baraga at the conclusion of the lease. This changed a bit in October 2019, when WMQU's lease was handed to Immaculate Heart Media, owners of Relevant Radio. CBS Sports Radio programming continued to be aired on WGRY-FM which is branded as "Y-101.1".

The planned donation to Relevant Radio fell through in February 2024, and WMQU went silent. Blarney Stone Broadcasting would return the WMQU license to the FCC, which cancelled it on October 3, 2024.

== See also ==
- WTCY
- WIDG
- Venerable Frederik Baraga (namesake of Baraga Radio)
