= WLDN =

Radio station in Ludington, Michigan

Coordinates: 43°55′01″N 86°26′12″W

- Ludington, Michigan; United States
- Broadcast area: Pentwater, Ludington, Manistee
- Frequency: 98.7 MHz
- Branding: News 97 & 98

Programming
- Format: Talk radio
- Affiliations: Michigan Radio Network

Ownership
- Owner: Synergy Media
- Sister stations: WKLA, WKLA-FM, WKZC, WMLQ, WWKR

History
- First air date: 2012
- Call sign meaning: Ludington

Technical information
- Licensing authority: FCC
- Facility ID: 189561
- Class: A
- ERP: 5,500 watts
- HAAT: 104.1 meters (342 ft)

Links
- Public license information: Public file; LMS

WLDN is an FM radio station owned by Synergy Media and is licensed to Ludington, Michigan. WLDN broadcasts from studios in Ludington, Michigan along with sister stations WKLA, WKLA-FM, WKZC, WMLQ, and WWKR. It runs a news/talk/sports format and can be heard as far north as Copemish, Michigan, as far east as Reed City, Michigan, and as far south as Whitehall, Michigan. Under certain conditions, it can be heard in parts of northeastern Wisconsin and in Traverse City, Michigan. However, WLDN encounters heavy interference to the south from WFGR, which also broadcasts on 98.7 from Grand Rapids, Michigan.

== History ==
WLDN received an original construction permit on October 18, 2011. At the time, the license was held by Lopester Broadcasting. Late in 2011, the CP was sold to Synergy Media, and the sale was consummated on January 25, 2012. In September 2012, WLDN started testing with a simulcast of sister station WMLQ, which already had (and still has) a translator in Ludington at 104.9 FM. WLDN started its current format in October, with its license being issued on October 17, 2012.

It is the Ludington-Manistee affiliate for Michigan State University sports and the Detroit Tigers Radio Network.
