= WJML (FM) =

Coordinates: 44.057°N 86.416°W

- Thompsonville, Michigan; United States
- Broadcast area: Traverse City, Michigan
- Frequency: 106.3 MHz

Programming
- Format: Country music

Ownership
- Owner: John Yob; (Mitten News LLC)
- Sister stations: WMTE-FM

History
- First air date: 1971 (as WKLA-FM)
- Former call signs: WKLA-FM (1971–2016); WWMN (2016–2024)
- Call sign meaning: John, Michael, and Linda Harrington, the children of the founder of WJML (1110 AM) and WJML-FM 98.9

Technical information
- Licensing authority: FCC
- Facility ID: 10809
- Class: A
- ERP: 2,200 watts
- HAAT: 116 meters (381 ft)

Links
- Public license information: Public file; LMS

WJML (106.3 FM) is a radio station owned by John Yob, through licensee Mitten News LLC. Licensed to Thompsonville, Michigan, the station serves the Traverse City market with a coverage area extending from the tip of the Leelanau Peninsula south to Manistee and Cadillac.

== History ==
WJML began operations in May 1971 as WKLA-FM and spent much of its programming day simulcasting its AM sister station throughout the 1970s. Around 1980, the station further separated programming from the AM's middle of the road format by moving into adult contemporary, although the station still simulcast the AM during certain dayparts until 2000.

Synergy Broadcast Media purchased WKLA-FM in 2012 from Lake Michigan Broadcasting. The deal did not close until June 19, 2013, at a price of $580,000 for WKLA-FM and sister stations WKLA and WKZC. Almost immediately, Synergy announced that it was seeking FCC approval to move the areas oldest operating FM station to Thompsonville, Michigan. (FCC File #BPH-20130801A0K).

The station changed its call sign to WWMN on August 15, 2016, with WKLA-FM moving to 96.3 FM and continuing with the Westwood One Hot AC format as "Hits 96" (now "96-3 KLA").

On November 18, 2016, WWMN debuted its new adult album alternative format, branded as "106.3 The Mitten". The format over time gravitated towards a modern AC-leaning presentation with lighter songs from the 1970s through the 1990s interspersed with upbeat tracks from more contemporary alternative artists.

On April 2, 2018, WWMN changed its format from adult album alternative to a simulcast of news/talk-formatted WJML (1110 AM) and WJNL (1210 AM).

On November 7, 2019, WWMN changed its format from news/talk to adult contemporary, branded as "94.5 & 106.3 North FM".

On June 22, 2020, WWMN changed its format from adult contemporary to a simulcast of album-oriented rock-formatted WQON (100.3 FM), branded as "Q100".

On March 31, 2023, WWMN went silent, due to the end of a local marketing agreement between Blarney Stone Broadcasting and Mitten News.

On October 18, 2023, WWMN returned to the air and is stunting with all-Grateful Dead music. The stunting has continued well into 2024.

Approximately one year later, on October 14, 2024, it was reported that the station is playing a modern country format.

WWMN and WJML swapped call signs on December 9, 2024.

== Sources ==
- Michiguide.com – WWMN History
