= WGRY-FM =

Coordinates: 44.571°N 84.693°W

- Roscommon, Michigan; United States
- Broadcast area: Crawford County
- Frequency: 101.1 MHz
- Branding: UpNorthsportsRadio/The Ticket

Programming
- Format: Sports
- Affiliations: Infinity Sports Network; Detroit Tigers Radio Network

Ownership
- Owner: Sheryl and Gerald Coyne; (Blarney Stone Broadcasting, Inc.)
- Sister stations: WQON

History
- First air date: March 12, 1990
- Former call signs: WQON (12/19/94- 1/14/13); WGRY-FM (3/13/89-12/19/94); WLAI (8/29/88-3/13/89)
- Call sign meaning: GRaYling

Technical information
- Licensing authority: FCC
- Facility ID: 23085
- Class: A
- ERP: 3,400 watts
- HAAT: 135 meters

Links
- Public license information: Public file; LMS
- Website: upnorthsportsradio.com

WGRY-FM (101.1 MHz, is a radio station broadcasting a sports format. Licensed to Roscommon, Michigan As of december 2025, Programming includes simulcasting from WXYT in Detroit branded as The Ticket, it first began broadcasting in 1990. WGRY-FM is owned by Sheryl and Gerald Coyne, through licensee Blarney Stone Broadcasting, Inc., and is co-owned with WMQU and WQON, at its facilities in Grayling.

== History ==
=== As WGRY-FM ===
WGRY-FM's roots can be traced back to as early as 1978, when a radio station in Grayling debuted at 100.1 FM with the call letters WQON, competing against separately-owned MOR/country music-formatted WGRY/1590 (now 1230). The stations would compete for ten years, until William S. Gannon purchased WGRY in 1988. In 1990, Gannon Broadcasting was granted Federal Communications Commission (FCC) approval to construct a new station licensed to Roscommon broadcasting at 101.1 on the FM dial. The Construction Permit originally bore the WLAI calls but never was on the air with that call sign. WGRY-FM made its debut on March 12 of that year at 6,000 watts, broadcasting out of the same studio, located in Grayling, as its sister station WGRY.

Gannon Broadcasting, in the growth mode, continued to look for other properties to add to its Broadcast enterprise. The opportunity to buy WQON-FM 100.1 presented itself in 1994. The station had been granted a construction permit to substantially increase its power, but its ownership at that time chose to sell the station and concentrate their interests on their AM station in the Lansing area. Taking advantage of a peculiar situation, Gannon Broadcasting acquired WQON-FM and moved its studios to the WGRY-AM-FM location. In a move to take advantage of a strong country format, Gannon Broadcasting Systems requested approval from the FCC to allow WQON-FM and WGRY-FM to switch frequencies and to move the former WQON from 100.1 to 100.3. This would permit Gannon Broadcasting Systems to increase from 3,000 to 26,500 watts. Then Gannon Broadcasting Systems made improvements to equipment and built a new 1,350 sq. ft. addition to the original WGRY-AM studio to accommodate the three stations. Hiring a high powered engineering firm, Gannon gained approval from the FCC and the Canadian Radio-television and Telecommunications Commission (CRTC) in 1995 to increase its power to 60,000 watts with an option to move to a full 100,000 watts, making Y-100.3 WGRY a regional powerhouse.

With the moves completed for the new WGRY-FM 100.3, Gannon Broadcasting made the "new" WQON a strong local "listen-at-work" radio station, using Jones Radio Network's "Soft Hits" adult contemporary format, and branding the station as "Decades 101". The station continued with the AC format through Jones Radio Networks' sale to Triton Media Group which owns the Dial Global stable of formats.

=== Decades 101 ===
WGRY simulcast WQON full-time from 1995 until the turn of the 21st century, when it was given its own identity once again. WGRY was re-branded in January 2001 with the "Music of Your Life" format from "Jones Radio Network", which provided satellite-delivered music programming for WQON and WGRY-FM, outside of morning drive. Decades 101 became a standalone station. WGRY remains a standards format today but has since switched from Music of Your Life to Dial Global's America's Best Music.

Dave Sherbert, operations manager for the three stations, first joined WGRY-AM-FM in 1992. He eventually became the morning personality on Decades 101.1 FM WQON. The remainder of the station remained satellite-fed from Dial Global.

=== Y101.1 ===
In July 2012, it was announced that WQON and sister stations WGRY and WGRY-FM were being sold by William Gannon to Sheryl and Jerry Coyne's Blarney Stone Broadcasting,. Gannon expressed a desire to get out of the broadcasting business after suffering a stroke in the summer of 2011. No change to the station's adult contemporary format was planned although the Coynes expressed a desire to add more local programming. The sale was consummated on October 2, 2012, for consideration of $425,000.

On January 14, 2013, WQON swapped call letters with 100.3 WGRY-FM and rebranded as "Y 101.1".

=== As a sports station ===
On February 18, 2013, WGRY-FM flipped to sports talk, maintaining the Y 101.1 branding with programming from CBS Sports Radio.

in December 2025 WGRY became a simulcaster of Detroit based 97.1 The Ticket

[3][4]

On May 2, 2021, the Up North Sports Radio programming gained additional simulcasts on 1110 WJML/Petoskey and 1210 WJNL/Kingsley. In December 2025, the station began carrying a weekday lineup fed by Detroit's WXYT-FM, as part of the newly-launched 97.1 Detroit Sports Radio Network.
