= WKLA-FM =

- Ludington, Michigan; United States
- Frequency: 96.3 MHz
- Branding: 96.3 KLA

Programming
- Format: Top 40 (CHR)
- Affiliations: Local Radio Network (Hot Hits)

Ownership
- Owner: Synergy Media, Inc.
- Sister stations: WKLA, WKZC, WLDN, WWKR

History
- First air date: August 15, 2016
- Former call signs: WNOM (2015–2016)
- Call sign meaning: Karl L. Ashbacker (original owner)

Technical information
- Licensing authority: FCC
- Facility ID: 191495
- Class: A
- ERP: 3,400 watts
- HAAT: 118 meters
- Transmitter coordinates: 43°55′01″N 86°26′12″W

Links
- Public license information: Public file; LMS

WKLA-FM (96.3 FM, "96.3 KLA") is a radio station located in Ludington, Michigan. It is branded as 96.3 KLA and broadcasts a Top 40 (CHR) format.

== History ==
=== The original WKLA-FM ===
The original WKLA-FM is what is now WWMN, which began operations in May 1971 and spent much of its programming day simulcasting its AM sister station throughout the 1970s. Around 1980, the station further separated programming from the AM's Middle of the Road format by moving into Adult Contemporary, which remained the station's format until 2019, although the station still simulcast the AM during certain dayparts until 2000.

Synergy Broadcast Media purchased WKLA-FM in 2012 from Lake Michigan Broadcasting. The deal did not close until June 19, 2013, at a price of $580,000 for WKLA-FM and sister stations WKLA and WKZC. Almost immediately, Synergy announced that it was seeking FCC approval to move the areas oldest operating FM station to Thompsonville, Michigan. (FCC File #BPH-20130801A0K).

The station changed its call sign to WWMN on August 15, 2016. On November 18, 2016, WWMN debuted its new adult album alternative format, branded as "106.3 The Mitten".

=== 96.3 FM history ===
In 2013, the owners of WGHN-AM/FM applied for a construction permit on 97.7 FM in Ludington. In early 2016, the construction permit was moved to 96.3 to avoid interference from WMLQ in Manistee. In August 2016, WKLA-FM moved to 96.3 FM and continued the Westwood One Hot AC format as "Hits 96" (now "96-3 KLA" to avoid confusion with WSFQ, which, at the time, was known as "Hits 96" and also on 96.3; WKLA and WSFQ, along with WLXT in Petoskey, are known for interfering with each other in the Manistee area). Early 2019, 96.3 KLA flipped from Hot AC to Top 40 (CHR).
