= WJNL =

- Kingsley, Michigan; United States
- Broadcast area: Traverse City, Michigan
- Frequency: 1210 kHz

Programming
- Format: Stunting

Ownership
- Owner: Mitten News LLC

History
- First air date: April 17, 1947 (as WKNX)
- Former call signs: WKNX (1947–1997); WJZZ (1997–2001); WLDR (2001–2002); WWJR (2002); WLDR (2002–2007)
- Call sign meaning: Similar to sister station WJML

Technical information
- Licensing authority: FCC
- Facility ID: 4599
- Class: D
- Power: 10,000 watts day; 2,500 watts critical hours
- Transmitter coordinates: 44.559°N 85.593°W
- Translator: 101.1 W266CS (Traverse City)

Links
- Public license information: Public file; LMS

WJNL (1210 AM) is a radio station licensed to Kingsley, Michigan, and serving the Traverse City area. The station is owned by Mitten News LLC. The station is also rebroadcast on 101.1 FM, through a translator in Traverse City, Michigan.

== History ==
=== WKNX in Saginaw ===
The station began broadcasting April 17, 1947, holding the call sign WKNX, and was licensed to Saginaw, Michigan. The station was owned by Lake Huron Broadcasting. The station ran 1,000 watts, during daytime hours only. In 1960, the station's power was increased to 10,000 watts. In the 1940s, 1950s, and 1960s, the station aired a country music format. By 1964, the station was airing a top 40 format. The station would become an affiliate of American Top 40. By the late 1970s, the station was airing a MOR format. In 1978, the station was sold to Radiocom for $600,000. By 1980, the station was again airing a top 40 format.

By the mid-1980s, the station would begin airing an oldies format. In 1993, the station was sold to Bell Broadcasting for $270,000. Bell Broadcasting intended to take the station off the air so that 1200 WCHB in Detroit could increase power. In 1997, the station's oldies format and call sign were moved to 1250 WJZZ, and the station was taken silent, with its call sign changed to WJZZ. That year, the station was granted a construction permit to move to Kingsley, Michigan, and increase its daytime power to 50,000 watts (2,500 watts critical hours).

=== After move to Kingsley ===
The station returned to the air in July 1999, after having been moved to Kingsley, Michigan, airing an urban oldies format, before again being silent in November of that year. It would return to the air in October 2000, again airing an urban oldies format, but again being taken silent in January 2001. In 2001, the station was sold to Fort Bend Broadcasting for $225,000. The station returned to the air in February 2001 airing an oldies format, with its format being changed to talk in March of that year, as an affiliate of Michigan Talk Radio Network for most of the day, but airing the audio of CNN Headline News during the afternoon drive. In August 2001, the station's call sign was changed to WLDR. In January 2002, the station's call sign was changed to WWJR, and in May 2002, it was changed back to WLDR.

In 2004, the station adopted a classic country format. In 2007, Fort Bend Broadcasting exchanged the station for 750 WWKK in Petoskey, Michigan, and $244,000 in cash, with Stone Communications taking ownership of 1210 WLDR. In April 2007, the station's call sign was changed to WJNL, and the station would begin simulcasting the talk programming of 1110 WJML in Petoskey, Michigan. In 2017, Mitten News LLC purchased the station, along with 1110 WJML, for $700,000.

On March 31, 2023, WJNL went silent, due the end of an LMA between Blarney Stone Broadcasting and Mitten News.

On October 18, 2023, WJNL returned to air, initially by stunting with music by Grateful Dead.

== FM translator ==
Broadcast translator for WJNL
Call sign	Frequency	City of license	FID	Class	FCC info
W266CS	101.1 FM	Traverse City, Michigan	147731	D	LMS
