= WQON =

Album-oriented rock radio station in Grayling, Michigan, United States

Coordinates: 44.571°N 84.693°W

- Grayling, Michigan; United States
- Broadcast area
- Frequency: 100.3 MHz
- Branding: Q-100

Programming
- Format: Album-oriented rock (AOR)
- Affiliations: United Stations Radio Networks; Detroit Lions Radio Network; Michigan IMG Sports Network

Ownership
- Owner: Sheryl and Gerald Coyne; (Blarney Stone Broadcasting, Inc.)
- Sister stations: WGRY-FM

History
- First air date: November 6, 1978
- Former call signs: WGRY-FM (12/19/1994-1/14/2013); WQON (11/1/91-12/19/94); WFXK (9/9/91-11/1/91); WQON (11/6/1978-9/9/91)

Technical information
- Licensing authority: FCC
- Facility ID: 23086
- Class: C1
- ERP: 60,000 watts
- HAAT: 131 meters

Links
- Public license information: Public file; LMS
- Webcast: Listen Live
- Website: q100-fm.com

WQON (100.3 FM, "Q 100.3") is a radio station broadcasting an album-oriented rock (AOR) format. Licensed to Grayling, Michigan, the seat of government in Crawford County, it first began broadcasting in 1978. The station brands itself as Q-100.

== History ==
=== WQON: The early years ===
WQON arose out of the staff of AM competitor WGRY, which first went on the air in 1970. Wayne Hindmarsh, one of that station's original employees, left WGRY to put his own station on the air.

With an intended target date of June 16, 1977, unexpected delays pushed WQON-FM's debut on the air to 12:06 p.m., November 6, 1978. Local owners were Ernie Dawson, William Scheer, Wayne Hindmarsh, and Chris Vansteenhouse. Located at 502 Norway street, a sign went up in the window stating "We're on the Air" 100.1 FM. WQON was on the air from 6 a.m. to Midnight, first operating with 3,000 watts of power. Wayne Hindmarsh was at the helm as Station/Sales Manager. Bob Greenwood, who began his career at WGRY (AM) years earlier was the program director. WQON's very first on-air personality was Carol Trudeau. Everyone had an air shift and wrote commercials, as well as numerous other duties around the fledgling station. Betty Bennett was the Office Manager.

It soon became apparent to the owners that WQON couldn't be the community station it wanted to be without more employees. Some of the first local personalities were Cheryl Alef, Chris Wright and Dave Gauthier. All were trained by Bob Greenwood and several have continued with successful careers in radio in Traverse City, Bakersfield, California, Houghton Lake and Petoskey. Chris Wright later changed his name to Chris Knight and owns an advertising agency. Community News and Sports were primary with WQON. Live broadcasts of away Football and Basketball games were featured throughout the season. WQON attended the opening of new businesses in the community. The Canoe Marathon, the Winter Sports Carnival and other local events were also broadcast. WQON-FM programming was Contemporary Music and News, plus Sports and Weather. The station sponsored special weekends, give-a-ways and dances.

In December 1982, Wayne Hindmarsh left the station to further his education by completing his MBA. In May 1985 the station was purchased by Robert Ditmer and his son Bob, owners of WWSJ of St. Johns, Michigan. Ditmer began a daily hour-long Talk Show/Swap Shop which was taken over by Dave Sherbert in 1989. Sherbert had joined the station in 1985. Robert Ditmer left the station in 1989 to manage his other station in St. Johns and Bob Ditmer became manager and program director.

=== Sale to Gannon Broadcasting/Y100 is born ===
In 1994, the Ditmers, despite having acquired a construction permit to raise WQON's power to 50,000 watts and change its frequency, decided to leave the radio business in Crawford County and concentrate on their interests in St. Johns. Gannon Broadcasting jumped at the opportunity and agreed to purchase WQON that year.

Gannon Broadcasting acquired WQON-FM and moved its studios to the WGRY-AM-FM location. In a move to take advantage of a strong country format, Gannon Broadcasting Systems requested approval from the FCC to allow WQON-FM and WGRY-FM to switch frequencies and to change 100.1 to 100.3 MHz. This would permit Gannon Broadcasting Systems to increase from 3,000 to 26,500 watts. Then Gannon Broadcasting Systems made improvements to equipment and built a new 1,350 sq. ft. addition to the original WGRY studio to accommodate the three stations. In 1995 Gannon Broadcasting made its final move. Hiring a high–powered engineering firm, Gannon gained approval from the FCC and Canadian Government to increase its power to 60,000 watts with an option to move to a full 100,000 watts making the new Y-100.3 WGRY-FM a real powerhouse.

== Y100 ==
Most of Y100's programming (outside of weekday mornings and weekend specialty shows) was satellite-fed from Dial Global's Hot Country network.

Sunday mornings at 8, Y100 featured a Country Gold program called "Pure Country Memories" with performers from the 1930s through the 1970s. This was one of the station's most popular feature programs, especially with the 50-and-up demographics.

Longtime northern Michigan radio personality Pete Michaels was the morning DJ on Y-100.3 FM WGRY. His morning show was heavy on news, sports and weather.

== Blarney Stone brings format and call sign change ==
In July 2012, it was announced that WGRY-FM and sister stations WGRY and WQON were being sold by William Gannon to Sheryl and Jerry Coyne (d/b/a Blarney Stone Broadcasting, Inc.). Gannon expressed a desire to get out of the broadcasting business after suffering a stroke in the summer of 2011. No change to the station's country format was planned although the Coynes expressed a desire to add more local programming. The sale was consummated on October 2, 2012 for consideration of $425,000.

On January 14, 2013 WGRY-FM and adult contemporary-formatted sister station WQON 101.1 FM swapped call letters, and the new 100.3 WQON changed its format from country to Rock & Roll, branded as Q-100 The Only Place for Rock & Roll. Home of Detroit Lions Football, University of Michigan Football/Basketball and Voice of Grayling Viking High School Sports. The station is an affiliate of the syndicated Pink Floyd program "Floydian Slip."

In February 2013, WGRY-AM-FM, became a sports-talk station airing programming from CBS Sports Radio. In January 2016, WGRY AM 1230 was spun off to a Catholic broadcaster and the callsign changed WMQU.

== LMA with Northern Radio ==
In September 2016, it was announced that the Coyne's would acquire the properties of Northern Radio of Michigan The transaction would have put competitor WKLT under the same ownership as WQON. The deal was originally announced as a "sale" however no formal documentation was filed with the FCC. Contest rules on the WQON website referenced Blarney Stone having a Local Marketing Agreement (LMA) with Northern. The agreement between Northern and Blarney Stone never closed, and the LMA was canceled September 30, 2018.

Blarney Stone's vision, although never fulfilled, was to simulcast WQON with WKLT. This would make a trimulcast with substantial overlapping coverage areas. Blarney Stone was also to launch a new adult hits format on WFCX and WFDX called The Trail. Meanwhile, to keep Blarney Stone broadcasting within FCC ownership caps, WSRT was to be sold or donated to Catholic radio operator Baraga Broadcasting. None of the aforementioned changes ultimately occurred.

== LMA with Roy Henderson ==
A new local marketing agreement between Blarney Stone and another Northern Michigan broadcaster was announced on October 1, 2018. This time, the Coynes would partner with Roy Henderson, an owner-operator whose handful of Traverse City area stations were facing a multitude of financial and technical issues, including legal action from the Federal Communications Commission.

Under the LMA, Henderson's WOUF in Beulah began simulcasting WQON's Q-100 rock format. WOUF's call letters were subsequently changed to WQAN. Meanwhile, WBNZ in Frankfort flipped to a sports talk simulcast of Blarney Stone's WGRY-FM in Roscommon branded as Up North Sports Radio.
