= WWMN (AM) =

Coordinates: 45°20′05″N 84°55′34″W

- Petoskey, Michigan; United States
- Broadcast area: Petoskey, Michigan
- Frequency: 1110 kHz

Programming
- Format: Silent

Ownership
- Owner: Mitten News LLC

History
- First air date: December 6, 1966
- Former call signs: WJML (1966–2024)

Technical information
- Licensing authority: FCC
- Facility ID: 63483
- Class: D
- Power: 10,000 watts (daytime); 10 watts (nighttime)

Links
- Public license information: Public file; LMS

WWMN (1110 AM) is a radio station licensed to Petoskey, Michigan, which is owned by John Yob, through licensee Mitten News LLC.

== History ==
=== Signing on ===
In somewhat of a rarity, WJML-FM 98.9 started first, on December 7, 1965, since in most situations, the AM station is usually the first to sign on. In the beginning, the station was an automated MOR format, with one live DJ, Bill Supernaw, in the morning (Supernaw was the owner of the Cinema III movie theatre in Charlevoix). The station was owned by a Chicago broadcaster who named his station after his three children, John, Michael and Linda. It was one of northern Michigan's first-ever FM stations, and since many folks did not have an FM radio at the time, an AM station, WJML (1110 AM) went on the air on December 6, 1966. WJML was at the time the strongest AM station in northern Michigan during the daytime at 10 kW. However, the station was daytime only.

=== 2010s ===
On May 29, 2015, WJML's FM repeater in Charlevoix, W235CL on 94.9, signed on, providing 24/7 daytime coverage to the immediate Charlevoix area, with 250 watts of power. Effective August 8, 2016, W235CL moved to 101.1 FM in Traverse City as W266CS. On January 31, 2017, WJML, WJNL and W266CS were sold to John Yob's Mitten News LLC for $700,000; the sale was consummated on May 23, 2017.

As of May 13, 2018, WJML could be heard on WWMN 106.3 in Thompsonville, WYPV 94.5 in Mackinaw City and WHAK 960 in Rogers City.

=== 2020s ===
On June 22, 2020, WWMN and WYPV changed their simulcasts to that of album-oriented rock-formatted WQON, and no longer broadcast WJML on their signals.

In June 2022, WJML went silent. It returned to the air on June 20, 2023.

WJML and WWMN swapped call signs on December 9, 2024.
