= Beulah, Michigan =

- Village
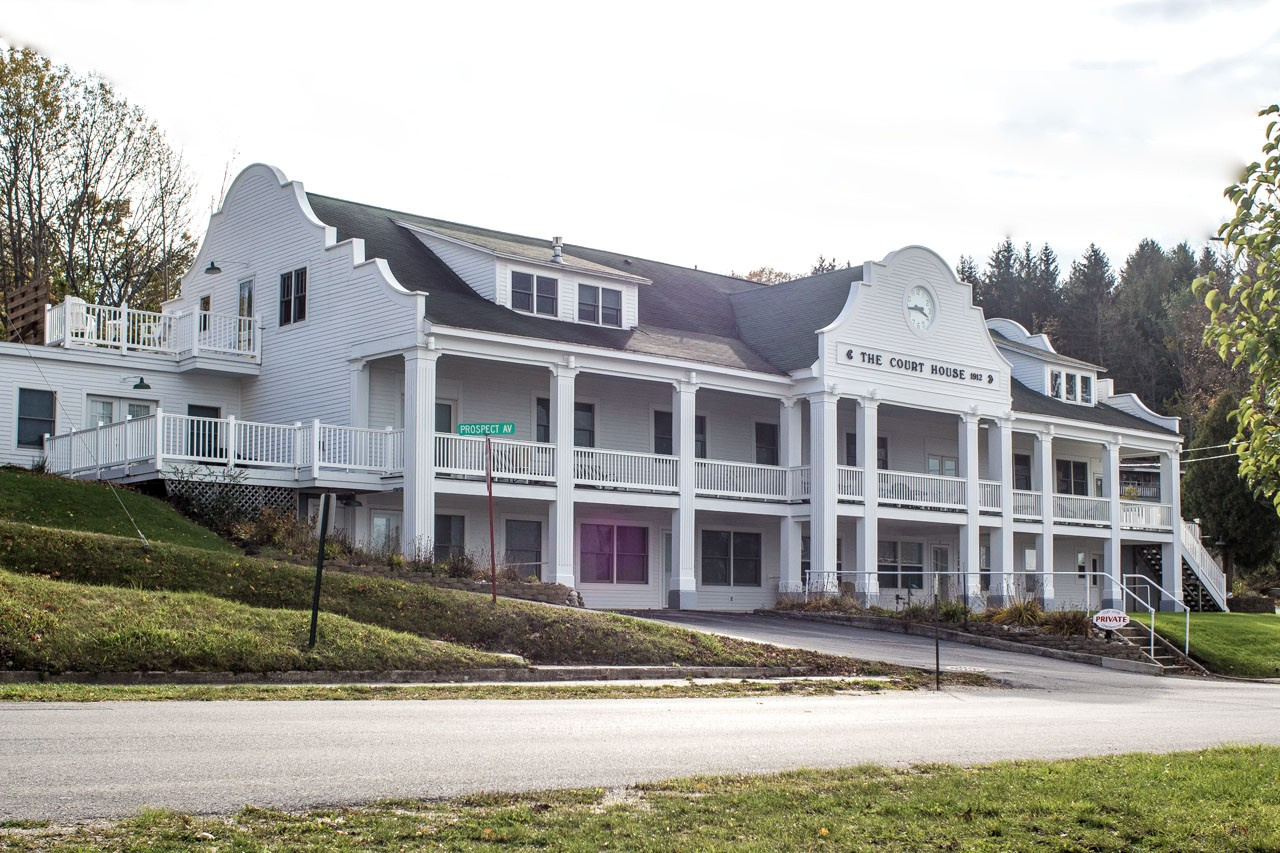
- Old Benzie County Courthouse

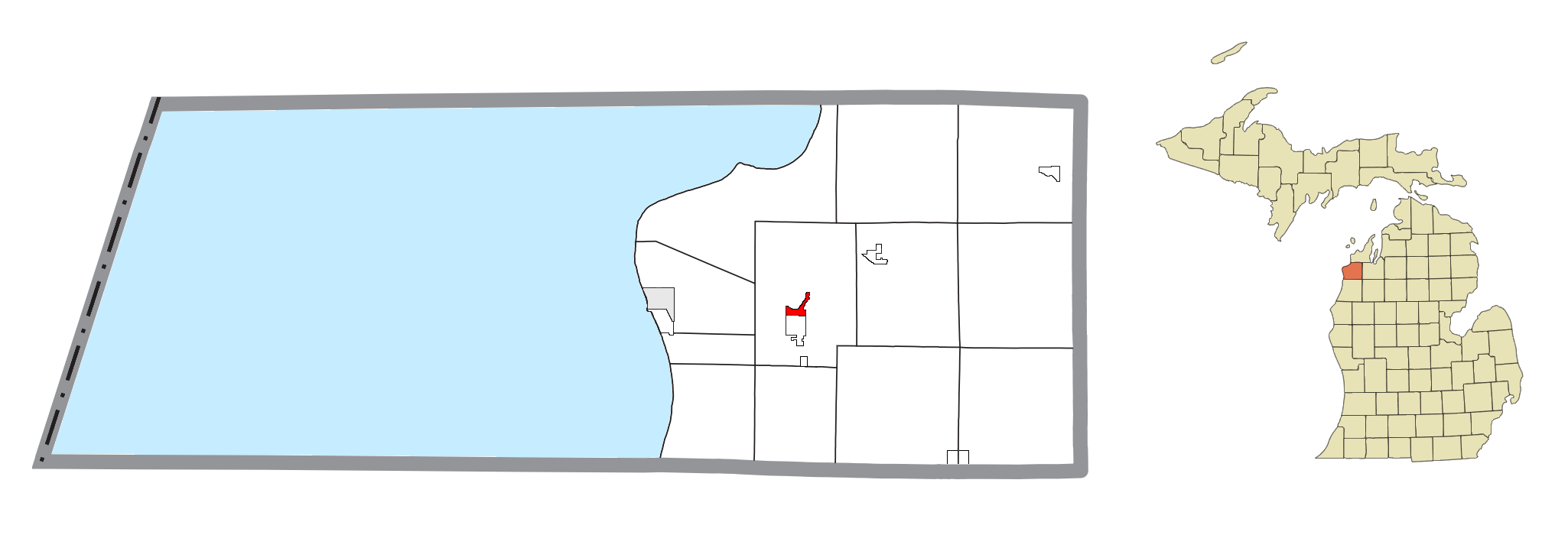
- Location within Benzie County

- Location within the state of Michigan
- Coordinates: 44°37′46″N 86°05′45″W
- Country: United States
- State: Michigan
- County: Benzie
- Township: Benzonia

Area
  - Total: 0.42 sq mi (1.08 km^{2})
  - Land: 0.41 sq mi (1.07 km^{2})
  - Water: 0 sq mi (0.00 km^{2})
- Elevation: 607 ft (185 m)

Population (2020)
  - Total: 313
  - Density: 756.0/sq mi (291.91/km^{2})
- Time zone: UTC-5 (Eastern (EST))
  - Summer (DST): UTC-4 (EDT)
- ZIP code(s): 49617
- Area code: 231
- FIPS code: 26-08100
- GNIS feature ID: 2398114
- Website: https://www.villageofbeulah.net/

Beulah (/ˈbjuːlə/ BEW-lə) is a village in the U.S. state of Michigan. It is the county seat of Benzie County, and is located within Benzonia Township. The village had a population of 313 at the 2020 census. The village sits at the southeast end of Crystal Lake, and is immediately north of the village of Benzonia.

== History ==
Beulah was founded in 1880 by Charles E. Bailey. Its name comes from Isaiah 62:4. The Beulah post office was established in 1892.

== Geography ==
According to the United States Census Bureau, the village has a total area of 0.43 square miles (1.11 km^{2}), all land.

== Climate ==
According to the Köppen Climate Classification system, Beulah has a warm-summer humid continental climate, abbreviated "Dfb" on climate maps. The hottest temperature recorded in Beulah was 95 °F (35.0 °C) on August 1, 2006, and July 3, 2012, while the coldest temperature recorded was −10 °F (−23.3 °C) on March 15–16, 2014, March 20, 2015, and February 3, 2015.

Climate data for Beulah, Michigan, 1991–2020 normals, extremes 2000–present
| Month | Jan | Feb | Mar | Apr | May | Jun | Jul | Aug | Sep | Oct | Nov | Dec | Year |
|---|---|---|---|---|---|---|---|---|---|---|---|---|---|
| Record high °F (°C) | 59 (15) | 63 (17) | 84 (29) | 83 (28) | 94 (34) | 94 (34) | 95 (35) | 95 (35) | 91 (33) | 86 (30) | 75 (24) | 63 (17) | 95 (35) |
| Mean maximum °F (°C) | 46.7 (8.2) | 47.4 (8.6) | 60.9 (16.1) | 75.3 (24.1) | 85.7 (29.8) | 88.2 (31.2) | 90.3 (32.4) | 88.5 (31.4) | 86.9 (30.5) | 76.1 (24.5) | 63.3 (17.4) | 51.2 (10.7) | 91.8 (33.2) |
| Mean daily maximum °F (°C) | 29.3 (−1.5) | 31.4 (−0.3) | 41.5 (5.3) | 53.6 (12.0) | 66.4 (19.1) | 75.6 (24.2) | 79.5 (26.4) | 78.1 (25.6) | 71.4 (21.9) | 58.1 (14.5) | 44.7 (7.1) | 34.0 (1.1) | 55.3 (12.9) |
| Daily mean °F (°C) | 23.2 (−4.9) | 24.3 (−4.3) | 32.4 (0.2) | 43.5 (6.4) | 55.3 (12.9) | 64.6 (18.1) | 69.2 (20.7) | 68.0 (20.0) | 61.5 (16.4) | 49.7 (9.8) | 38.2 (3.4) | 28.4 (−2.0) | 46.5 (8.1) |
| Mean daily minimum °F (°C) | 17.0 (−8.3) | 17.3 (−8.2) | 23.3 (−4.8) | 33.3 (0.7) | 44.3 (6.8) | 53.6 (12.0) | 58.8 (14.9) | 57.9 (14.4) | 51.6 (10.9) | 41.3 (5.2) | 31.7 (−0.2) | 22.9 (−5.1) | 37.7 (3.2) |
| Mean minimum °F (°C) | 1.8 (−16.8) | 2.0 (−16.7) | 6.5 (−14.2) | 21.0 (−6.1) | 29.9 (−1.2) | 40.4 (4.7) | 48.2 (9.0) | 47.1 (8.4) | 40.5 (4.7) | 29.1 (−1.6) | 18.7 (−7.4) | 10.7 (−11.8) | −1.3 (−18.5) |
| Record low °F (°C) | −9 (−23) | −10 (−23) | −10 (−23) | 10 (−12) | 25 (−4) | 34 (1) | 42 (6) | 40 (4) | 30 (−1) | 24 (−4) | 11 (−12) | 0 (−18) | −10 (−23) |
| Average precipitation inches (mm) | 2.47 (63) | 1.75 (44) | 2.14 (54) | 3.47 (88) | 3.16 (80) | 3.26 (83) | 2.98 (76) | 3.43 (87) | 3.50 (89) | 4.55 (116) | 3.09 (78) | 2.36 (60) | 36.16 (918) |
| Average snowfall inches (cm) | 26.8 (68) | 20.2 (51) | 11.2 (28) | 3.5 (8.9) | 0.0 (0.0) | 0.0 (0.0) | 0.0 (0.0) | 0.0 (0.0) | 0.0 (0.0) | 0.1 (0.25) | 7.7 (20) | 22.9 (58) | 92.4 (234.15) |
| Average precipitation days (≥ 0.01 in) | 18.6 | 14.1 | 11.2 | 12.3 | 13.4 | 10.9 | 10.7 | 10.0 | 11.6 | 16.3 | 14.9 | 16.9 | 160.9 |
| Average snowy days (≥ 0.1 in) | 17.4 | 14.5 | 7.8 | 3.3 | 0.2 | 0.0 | 0.0 | 0.0 | 0.0 | 0.2 | 5.3 | 14.0 | 62.7 |
Source 1: NOAA
Source 2: National Weather Service (mean maxima/minima 2006–2020)

=== Major highway ===
- US 31 runs north–south through the village.

== Demographics ==
Historical population
| Census | Pop. | Note | %± |
|---|---|---|---|
| 1940 | 378 | | — |
| 1950 | 458 | | 21.2% |
| 1960 | 436 | | −4.8% |
| 1970 | 461 | | 5.7% |
| 1980 | 454 | | −1.5% |
| 1990 | 421 | | −7.3% |
| 2000 | 363 | | −13.8% |
| 2010 | 342 | | −5.8% |
| 2020 | 313 | | −8.5% |
U.S. Decennial Census

=== 2020 census ===
As of the census of 2020, there were 313 people living in Beulah.

=== 2010 census ===
As of the census of 2010, there were 342 people, 161 households, and 81 families living in the village. The population density was 795.3 inhabitants per square mile (307.1/km^{2}). There were 375 housing units at an average density of 872.1 per square mile (336.7/km^{2}). The racial makeup of the village was 98.0% White, 0.3% African American, 0.3% Native American, 0.6% from other races, and 0.9% from two or more races. Hispanic or Latino of any race were 2.3% of the population.

There were 161 households, of which 12.4% had children under the age of 18 living with them, 41.0% were married couples living together, 8.7% had a female householder with no husband present, 0.6% had a male householder with no wife present, and 49.7% were non-families. 43.5% of all households were made up of individuals, and 19.3% had someone living alone who was 65 years of age or older. The average household size was 1.81 and the average family size was 2.44.

The median age in the village was 52.7 years. 10.5% of residents were under the age of 18; 8.1% were between the ages of 18 and 24; 19.6% were from 25 to 44; 37.2% were from 45 to 64; and 24.6% were 65 years of age or older. The gender makeup of the village was 51.5% male and 48.5% female.

=== 2000 census ===
As of the census of 2000, there were 341 people, 190 households, and 102 families living in the village. The population density was 798.2 inhabitants per square mile (308.2/km^{2}). There were 359 housing units at an average density of 789.4 per square mile (304.8/km^{2}). The racial makeup of the village was 98.35% White, 0.83% Native American, 0.55% from other races, and 0.28% from two or more races. Hispanic or Latino of any race were 1.65% of the population.

There were 190 households, out of which 17.9% had children under the age of 18 living with them, 38.9% were married couples living together, 12.1% had a female householder with no husband present, and 46.3% were non-families. 39.5% of all households were made up of individuals, and 21.6% had someone living alone who was 65 years of age or older. The average household size was 1.91 and the average family size was 2.49.

In the village, the population was spread out, with 14.3% under the age of 18, 6.6% from 18 to 24, 24.0% from 25 to 44, 28.1% from 45 to 64, and 27.0% who were 65 years of age or older. The median age was 49 years. For every 100 females, there were 84.3 males. For every 100 females age 18 and over, there were 82.9 males.

The median income for a household in the village was $31,250, and the median income for a family was $43,750. Males had a median income of $26,458 versus $22,396 for females. The per capita income for the village was $22,389. About 12.4% of families and 17.2% of the population were below the poverty line, including 14.3% of those under age 18 and 15.5% of those age 65 or over.
