= List of radio stations in Michigan =

The following is a list of FCC-licensed radio stations in the U.S. state of Michigan, which can be sorted by their call signs, frequencies, cities of license, licensees, and programming formats.

== List of radio stations ==
Call sign	Frequency	City of License	Licensee	Format
KDTI	90.3 FM	Rochester Hills	Educational Media Foundation	Contemporary Christian
KTGG	1540 AM	Okemos	West Central Michigan Media Ministries	Christian radio
WAAM	1600 AM	Ann Arbor	Coolarity A2, LLC	News Talk Information
WABJ	1490 AM	Adrian	Southeast Michigan Media, Inc.	News Talk Information
WAGN	1340 AM	Menominee	Radio Plus Bay Cities, LLC	Talk/Personality
WAHS	89.5 FM	Auburn Hills	Avondale School District	Variety
WAIR	104.9 FM	Lake City	Smile FM	Contemporary Christian
WAKV	980 AM	Otsego	Vintage Radio Enterprises, L.L.C.	Classic country
WATT	1240 AM	Cadillac	MacDonald Garber Broadcasting, Inc	News Talk Information
WATZ-FM	99.3 FM	Alpena	WATZ Radio, Inc.	Country
WAUS	90.7 FM	Berrien Springs	Andrews Broadcasting Corp.	Classical
WAVC	93.9 FM	Mio	West Central Michigan Media Ministries	Religious
WAWB-LP	107.3 FM	West Branch	West Branch Seventh Day Adventist Broadcasting, Inc.	Christian
WAWL-LP	103.5 FM	Grand Haven	Tri-Cities Broadcasting Foundation	Classic Rock News Sports
WAWM	98.9 FM	Petoskey	Educational Media Foundation	Contemporary Christian
WAXT-LP	98.9 FM	Whitehall	White Lake Broadcasters, Inc	Oldies
WBCH	1220 AM	Hastings	Barry Broadcasting Co.	Talk/Personality
WBCH-FM	100.1 FM	Hastings	Barry Broadcasting Co.	Country
WBCK	95.3 FM	Battle Creek	Townsquare License, LLC	News Talk Information
WBCM	93.5 FM	Boyne City	WBCM Radio, Inc.	Mainstream rock
WBCT	93.7 FM	Grand Rapids	iHM Licenses, LLC	Country
WBET	1230 AM	Sturgis	Swick Broadcasting Company, Inc.	Sports (FSR)
WBET-FM	99.3 FM	Sturgis	Swick Broadcasting Company, Inc.	Classic hits
WBFH	88.1 FM	Bloomfield Hills	Bloomfield Hills School District	Variety
WBFN	1400 AM	Battle Creek	Family Life Broadcasting System	Contemporary Christian
WBFX	101.3 FM	Grand Rapids	iHM Licenses, LLC	Classic hits/AC
WBGV	92.5 FM	Marlette	GB Broadcasting Company	Country
WBHC-LP	96.5 FM	Benton Harbor	Benton Harbor Area Schools	Urban gospel
WBHL	90.7 FM	Harrison	West Central Michigan Media Ministries	Religious
WBLD	89.3 FM	Orchard Lake	West Bloomfield School District	Top 40 (CHR)
WBLU-FM	88.9 FM	Grand Rapids	Blue Lake Fine Arts Camp	Classical/Jazz
WBLV	90.3 FM	Twin Lake	Blue Lake Fine Arts Camp	Classical/Jazz
WBLW	88.1 FM	Gaylord	Grace Baptist Church	Gospel
WBMI	105.5 FM	West Branch	CF Broadcasting, LLC	Silent
WBRN	1460 AM	Big Rapids	Mentor Partners, Inc.	News Talk Information
WBSV-LP	93.3 FM	Berrien Springs	Leland Straw Memorial Educational Fund, Inc.	Variety
WBTI	96.9 FM	Lexington	Liggett Communications, L.L.C.	Pop Contemporary Hit Radio
WBXX	104.9 FM	Marshall	Townsquare License, LLC	Urban adult contemporary
WBZX	103.9 FM	Big Rapids	Up North Radio, LLC	Classic hits
WCAR	1090 AM	Livonia	Birach Broadcasting Corporation	Spanish contemporary
WCBN-FM	88.3 FM	Ann Arbor	Regents of the University of Michigan	Variety
WCBY	1240 AM	Cheboygan	Black Diamond Broadcast Holdings, LLC.	Classic country
WCCW	1310 AM	Traverse City	WCCW Radio, Inc.	Sports
WCCW-FM	107.5 FM	Traverse City	WCCW Radio, Inc.	Classic hits
WCCY	1400 AM	Houghton	Houghton Community Broadcasting Corporation	Pop Contemporary Hit Radio
WCDY	107.9 FM	McBain	Up North Radio, LLC	Adult contemporary
WCEN-FM	94.5 FM	Hemlock	Alpha Media Licensee LLC	Country
WCFG	90.9 FM	Springfield	Cornerstone University	Contemporary Christian
WCFX	95.3 FM	Clare	Grenax Broadcasting, LLC	Pop Contemporary Hit Radio
WCHB	1340 AM	Royal Oak	WMUZ Radio, Inc.	Gospel
WCHT	600 AM	Escanaba	AMC Partners Escanaba, LLC	News Talk Information
WCHW-FM	91.3 FM	Bay City	School District, Bay City	Album oriented rock
WCHY	97.7 FM	Cheboygan	Michigan Broadcasters LLC	Talk/Oldies
WCKC	107.1 FM	Cadillac	Up North Radio, LLC	Classic rock
WCMB-FM	95.7 FM	Oscoda	Central Michigan University	Variety
WCML-FM	91.7 FM	Alpena	Central Michigan University	Variety
WCMM	102.5 FM	Gulliver	AMC Partners Escanaba, LLC	Country
WCMU-FM	89.5 FM	Mount Pleasant	Central Michigan University Board of Trustees	Variety
WCMV-FM	94.3 FM	Leland	Central Michigan University	Variety
WCMW-FM	103.9 FM	Harbor Springs	Central Michigan University	Variety
WCMZ-FM	98.3 FM	Sault Ste. Marie	Central Michigan University	Variety
WCPP-LP	102.1 FM	Ironwood	Copper Peak Incorporated	Variety
WCRR	88.9 FM	Manistique	Christianradiobroadcasting.org, Inc.	Contemporary Christian
WCRZ	107.9 FM	Flint	Townsquare Media of Flint, Inc.	Adult contemporary
WCSG	91.3 FM	Grand Rapids	Cornerstone University	Contemporary Christian
WCSR	1340 AM	Hillsdale	McKibbin Media Group, Inc.	Country
WCSR-FM	92.1 FM	Hillsdale	McKibbin Media Group, Inc.	Adult contemporary
WCSX	94.7 FM	Birmingham	Beasley Media Group, LLC	Classic rock
WCSY-FM	103.7 FM	South Haven	WSJM Inc	Classic hits
WCTP	88.5 FM	Gagetown	Smile FM	Southern gospel
WCUP	105.7 FM	L'Anse	Keweenaw Bay Indian Community	Country
WCVM	94.7 FM	Bronson	Taylor University Broadcasting, Inc.	Contemporary Christian
WCXB	89.9 FM	Benton Harbor	Cornerstone University	Contemporary Christian
WCXI	1160 AM	Fenton	Birach Broadcasting Corporation	Classic hits
WCXK	88.3 FM	Kalamazoo	Cornerstone University	Contemporary Christian
WCXT	98.3 FM	Hartford	WSJM Inc	Adult contemporary
WCZE	103.7 FM	Harbor Beach	Jennifer & Edward Czelada	Country
WCZY-FM	104.3 FM	Mount Pleasant	Latitude Media, LLC	Classic hits
WDBC	680 AM	Escanaba	Aurora Media, LLC	Soft adult contemporary
WDBM	88.9 FM	East Lansing	Board of Trustees of Michigan State University	Alternative
WDEE-FM	97.3 FM	Reed City	Steven V. Beilfuss	Oldies
WDEO	990 AM	Ypsilanti	AM Media Services	Catholic
WDET-FM	101.9 FM	Detroit	Wayne State University	News Talk Information
WDFN	1130 AM	Detroit	iHM Licenses, LLC	Black-oriented news
WDKL	102.7 FM	Mount Clemens	Educational Media Foundation	Contemporary Christian
WDLP-LP	93.1 FM	Belding	Montcalm Public Radio, Inc.	Oldies
WDMJ	1320 AM	Marquette	AMC Partners Escanaba, LLC	Oldies
WDMK	105.9 FM	Detroit	Beasley Media Group Licenses, LLC	Urban adult contemporary
WDPW	91.9 FM	Greenville	Larlen Communications Inc.	Gospel
WDTE	88.3 FM	Grosse Point Shores	Smile FM	Contemporary Christian
WDTK	1400 AM	Detroit	Caron Broadcasting, Inc.	News Talk Information
WDTP	89.5 FM	Huron Township	Smile FM	Contemporary Christian
WDTR	88.9 FM	Imlay City	Michigan Community Radio	Contemporary Christian
WDTW	1310 AM	Dearborn	Zamora Broadcasting Systems, Inc.	Regional Mexican
WDVD	96.3 FM	Detroit	Radio License Holdings LLC	Hot adult contemporary
WDZH	98.7 FM	Detroit	Audacy License, LLC	Alternative rock
WDZZ-FM	92.7 FM	Flint	Cumulus Licensing LLC	Urban adult contemporary
WEEH-LP	100.5 FM	Hart	Oceana Broadcasters, Inc	Oldies
WEJC	88.3 FM	White Star	Smile FM	Contemporary Christian
WEMU	89.1 FM	Ypsilanti	Eastern Michigan University	Jazz
WERW	94.3 FM	Monroe	Monroe Public Access Cable Television, Inc.	Classic hits
WEUL	98.1 FM	Kingsford	Gospel Opportunities, Inc.	Religious
WFAH-LP	102.1 FM	Flint	Greater Flint Arts Council	Variety
WFAT	930 AM	Battle Creek	Midwest Communications, Inc.	Oldies
WFBE	95.1 FM	Flint	Radio License Holding CBC, LLC	Country
WFCB-LP	100.7 FM	Ferndale	Underwood V Radio, Inc.	Variety
WFDF	910 AM	Farmington Hills	Adell Radio Group, Inc.	Conservative talk
WFDX	92.5 FM	Atlanta	William C Gleich	Silent
WFER	1230 AM	Iron River	Iron River Community Broadcasting Corporation	Classic country
WFFR-LP	100.9 FM	Roosevelt Park	Shoreline Broadcasting, Inc	Classic hits
WFGR	98.7 FM	Grand Rapids	Townsquare Media of Grand Rapids, Inc.	Sports
WFLT	1420 AM	Flint	Christian Evangelical Broadcasting Association	Gospel
WFMK	99.1 FM	East Lansing	Townsquare License, LLC	Adult contemporary
WFNT	88.7 FM	Adrian	Smile FM	Religious
WFOV-LP	92.1 FM	Flint	Flint Odyssey House Inc	Variety
WFPM-LP	99.5 FM	Battle Creek	First Pentecostal Church of God In Christ	Urban gospel
WFUM	91.1 FM	Flint	Regents of the University of Michigan	News Talk Information
WFUR	1570 AM	Grand Rapids	Furniture City Broadcasting Corp.	Contemporary Inspirational
WFXD	103.3 FM	Marquette	mediaBrew Communications Marquette LLC	Country
WFYC	1280 AM	Alma	Jacom, Inc.	Sports (FSR)
WGCP	91.9 FM	Cadillac	West Central Michigan Media Ministries	Religious
WGDN	1350 AM	Gladwin	Apple Broadcasting Company, Inc.	Religious
WGDN-FM	103.1 FM	Gladwin	Apple Broadcasting Company, Inc.	Country
WGER	106.3 FM	Saginaw	Alpha Media Licensee LLC	Alternative rock
WGFE	95.5 FM	Glen Arbor	Black Diamond Broadcast Holdings, LLC.	Active rock
WGFM	105.1 FM	Cheboygan	Black Diamond Broadcast Holdings, LLC.	Active rock
WGFN	98.1 FM	Glen Arbor	Black Diamond Broadcast Holdings, LLC.	Classic rock
WGGL-FM	91.1 FM	Houghton	Minnesota Public Radio	Public radio, Classical
WGHN	1370 AM	Grand Haven	WGHN, Inc.	Album-oriented rock
WGHN-FM	92.1 FM	Grand Haven	WGHN, Inc.	Adult contemporary
WGJU	91.3 FM	East Tawas	Relevant Radio, Inc.	Catholic
WGKL	105.5 FM	Gladstone	AMC Partners Escanaba, LLC	Classic hits
WGKZ-LP	88.7 FM	Quinesec	Kingsford Community Radio, Inc.	Variety
WGLI	98.7 FM	Hancock	Keweenaw Bay Indian Community	Active rock
WGLM	1380 AM	Greenville	Packer Radio Greenville, Inc.	Adult hits
WGLM-FM	106.3 FM	Lakeview	Packer Radio Greenville, Inc.	Adult hits
WGLN-LP	93.5 FM	Cedar Lake	Great Lakes Adventist Academy	Christian
WGLQ	97.1 FM	Escanaba	AMC Partners Escanaba, LLC	Pop Contemporary Hit Radio
WGMV	106.3 FM	Stephenson	AMC Partners Escanaba, LLC	Classic Country
WGNB	89.3 FM	Zeeland	The Moody Bible Institute of Chicago	Religious
WGNC-FM	88.5 FM	Constantine	Christian Radio Friends, Inc.	Country
WGPG-LP	92.9 FM	Battle Creek	Battle Creek Community Radio	Christian
WGPR	107.5 FM	Detroit	WGPR, Inc.	Black music
WGRD-FM	97.9 FM	Grand Rapids	Townsquare Media of Grand Rapids, Inc.	Mainstream rock
WGRT	102.3 FM	Port Huron	Port Huron Family Radio, Inc.	Adult contemporary
WGRY-FM	101.1 FM	Roscommon	Blarney Stone Broadcasting, Inc.	Sports (ISN)
WGTO	910 AM	Cassopolis	Larry Langford, Jr.	Gold hot AC
WGVS-FM	95.3 FM	Whitehall	Grand Valley State University	News Talk Information
WGVU-FM	88.5 FM	Allendale	Grand Valley State University	News Talk Information
WGZR	88.9 FM	Alpena	Relevant Radio, Inc.	Catholic
WHAK	960 AM	Rogers City	Mitten News LLC	Silent
WHAK-FM	99.9 FM	Rogers City	Edwards Communications LC	Classic hits
WHBP	90.1 FM	Harbor Springs	Interlochen Center for the Arts	News Talk Information
WHCH	99.9 FM	Custer	Hit Radio Media, LLC	Classic hits
WHEY	88.9 FM	North Muskegon	Muskegon Community Radio Broadcast Company	Contemporary Christian
WHFB	1060 AM	Benton Harbor-St. Joseph	Gerard Media, LLC	Urban oldies
WHFR	89.3 FM	Dearborn	Henry Ford Community College	Variety
WHKB	102.3 FM	Houghton	Houghton Community Broadcasting Corporation	Country
WHMI-FM	93.5 FM	Howell	Krol Communications Inc.	Classic hits
WHNN	96.1 FM	Bay City	Radio License Holding CBC, LLC	Adult contemporary
WHPD	92.1 FM	Dowagiac	Lesea Broadcasting Corporation	Contemporary Christian
WHPR-FM	88.1 FM	Highland Park	R.J.'s Late Night Entertainment Corporation	Variety
WHSB	107.7 FM	Alpena	Edwards Communications LC	Pop Contemporary Hit Radio
WHST	94.1 FM	Pigeon	Thumb Broadcasting, Inc.	Country
WHTC	1450 AM	Holland	Midwest Communications, Inc.	News Talk Information
WHTO	106.7 FM	Iron Mountain	Results Broadcasting of Iron Mountain, Inc.	Classic hits
WHTS	105.3 FM	Coopersville	Radio License Holding CBC, LLC	Pop Contemporary Hit Radio
WHWG	89.9 FM	Trout Lake	Gospel Opportunities, Inc.	Religious
WHWL	95.7 FM	Marquette	Gospel Opportunities, Inc.	Religious
WHYB	103.7 FM	Menominee	Radio Plus Bay Cities, LLC	Classic hits
WHYT	88.1 FM	Goodland Township	Smile FM	Contemporary Christian
WHZZ	101.7 FM	Lansing	The MacDonald Broadcasting Company	Adult hits
WIAA	88.7 FM	Interlochen	Interlochen Center for the Arts	Classical
WIAB	88.5 FM	Mackinaw City	Interlochen Center for the Arts	Classical
WIBM	1450 AM	Jackson	McKibbin Media Group, Inc.	Country
WICA	91.5 FM	Traverse City	Interlochen Center for the Arts	News Talk Information
WIDG	940 AM	St. Ignace	Relevant Radio, Inc.	Catholic
WIDL	92.1 FM	Cass City	Edwards Communications LC	Classic rock
WIDR	89.1 FM	Kalamazoo	Western Michigan University	Variety
WIHC	97.9 FM	Newberry	West Central Michigan Media Ministries	Religious
WIKB-FM	99.1 FM	Iron River	Iron River Community Broadcasting Corporation	Classic hits
WILS	1320 AM	Lansing	The MacDonald Broadcasting Company	News Talk Information
WILZ	104.5 FM	Saginaw	Radio License Holding CBC, LLC	Classic rock
WIMI	99.7 FM	Ironwood	J & J Broadcasting, Inc.	Classic rock
WIMK	93.1 FM	Iron Mountain	AMC Partners Escanaba, LLC	Active rock
WIOG	102.5 FM	Bay City	Radio License Holding CBC, LLC	Pop Contemporary Hit Radio
WION	1430 AM	Ionia	Packer Radio WION, LLC	Adult hits
WIOS	1480 AM	Tawas City-East Tawas	Carroll Enterprises, Inc	Talk/Personality
WIRX	107.1 FM	St. Joseph	WSJM, Inc.	Mainstream rock
WITL-FM	100.7 FM	Lansing	Townsquare License, LLC	Country
WJIM	1240 AM	Lansing	Townsquare License, LLC	News Talk Information
WJIM-FM	97.5 FM	Lansing	Townsquare License, LLC	Pop Contemporary Hit Radio
WJKN	1510 AM	Jackson	Jackson Lansing Catholic Radio dba Good Shepherd Radio	Catholic
WJKN-FM	89.3 FM	Spring Arbor	Spring Arbor University	Christian radio
WJLB	97.9 FM	Detroit	iHM Licenses, LLC	Urban contemporary
WJMK	1250 AM	Bridgeport	Northern States Broadcasting Corporation	Oldies
WJML	106.3 FM	Thompsonville	Mitten News LLC	Country
WJMS	590 AM	Ironwood	J & J Broadcasting, Inc.	Country
WJNL	1210 AM	Kingsley	Mitten News LLC	Stunting
WJNR-FM	101.5 FM	Iron Mountain	Results Broadcasting of Iron Mountain, Inc.	Country
WJOG	91.3 FM	Good Hart	Michigan Community Radio	Contemporary Christian
WJOH	91.5 FM	Raco	Michigan Community Radio	Contemporary Christian
WJOJ	89.7 FM	Rust Township	Northland Community Broadcasters	Contemporary Christian
WJOM	88.5 FM	Eagle	Michigan Community Radio	Contemporary Christian
WJPD	92.3 FM	Ishpeming	AMC Partners Escanaba, LLC	Country
WJQK	99.3 FM	Zeeland	Lanser Broadcasting Corporation	Christian adult contemporary
WJR	760 AM	Detroit	Radio License Holdings LLC	News Talk Information
WJRW	1340 AM	Grand Rapids	Radio License Holding CBC, LLC	Sports (ISN/FSR)
WJSZ	92.5 FM	Ashley	Krol Communications Inc.	Hot adult contemporary
WJWC-LP	97.3 FM	Grand Rapids	Empowerment Radio Project	Urban
WJXQ	106.1 FM	Charlotte	Midwest Communications, Inc.	Active rock
WJZQ	92.9 FM	Cadillac	WKJF Radio, Inc.	Hot adult contemporary
WKAD	93.7 FM	Harrietta	Cadillac Broadcasting, LLC	Sports (FSR)
WKAR	870 AM	East Lansing	Board of Trustees, Michigan State University	News Talk Information
WKAR-FM	90.5 FM	East Lansing	Board of Trustees, Michigan State University	Classical
WKBZ	1090 AM	Muskegon	iHM Licenses, LLC	News Talk Information
WKCQ	98.1 FM	Saginaw	The MacDonald Broadcasting Company	Country
WKDS	89.9 FM	Kalamazoo	Kalamazoo Public Schools	Classical
WKEG	1030 AM	Sterling Heights	Relevant Radio, Inc.	Catholic
WKFR-FM	103.3 FM	Battle Creek	Townsquare License, LLC	Pop Contemporary Hit Radio
WKHM	970 AM	Jackson	McKibbin Media Group, Inc.	News Talk Information
WKHM-FM	105.3 FM	Brooklyn	McKibbin Media Group, Inc.	Adult Contemporary
WKHQ-FM	105.9 FM	Charlevoix	MacDonald Garber Broadcasting, Inc	Pop Contemporary Hit Radio
WKIW	88.3 FM	Ironwood	Educational Media Foundation	Contemporary Christian
WKJC	104.7 FM	Tawas City	Carroll Enterprises, Inc.	Country
WKJZ	94.9 FM	Hillman	Carroll Enterprises, Inc.	Classic hits
WKKM	89.7 FM	Speaker Township	Smile FM	Contemporary Christian
WKKM-LP	106.5 FM	Harrison	The Country King, Incorporated	Traditional Country
WKLA	1450 AM	Ludington	Synergy Media, Inc.	Oldies
WKLA-FM	96.3 FM	Ludington	Synergy Media, Inc	Pop Contemporary Hit Radio
WKLQ	94.5 FM	Holland	Radio License Holding CBC, LLC	Adult album alternative
WKLT	97.5 FM	Kalkaska	WBCM Radio, Inc.	Mainstream rock
WKMH	102.5 FM	Hudson	Educational Media Foundation	Contemporary Christian
WKMI	1360 AM	Kalamazoo	Townsquare License, LLC	News/Talk
WKMJ-FM	93.5 FM	Hancock	J & Broadcasting, Inc.	Hot adult contemporary
WKNW	1400 AM	Sault Sainte Marie	Sovereign Communications, LLC	News/Talk
WKPK	88.3 FM	Michigamme	Northland Community Broadcasters	Contemporary Christian
WKQI	95.5 FM	Detroit	iHM Licenses, LLC	Pop Contemporary Hit Radio
WKQS-FM	101.9 FM	Negaunee	mediaBrew Communications Marquette LLC	Adult contemporary
WKQZ	93.3 FM	Midland	Radio License Holding CBC, LLC	Active rock
WKUF-LP	94.3 FM	Flint	Kettering University	Variety
WKYO	1360 AM	Caro	Edwards Communications LC	Classic country
WKZC	94.9 FM	Scottville	Synergy Media, Inc.	Country
WKZO	590 AM	Kalamazoo	Midwest Communications, Inc.	News Talk Information
WLAV-FM	96.9 FM	Grand Rapids	Radio License Holding CBC, LLC	Classic rock
WLBY	1290 AM	Saline	Cumulus Licensing LLC	Talk/Personality
WLCM	1390 AM	Holt	Christian Broadcasting System, Ltd.	Religious
WLCO	1530 AM	Lapeer	Smile FM	Classic rock
WLCS	98.3 FM	North Muskegon	Radio License Holding CBC, LLC	Classic hits
WLCV-LP	103.9 FM	Ludington	Ludington Area Catholic School	Catholic
WLDN	98.7 FM	Ludington	Synergy Lakeshore Licenses, LLC	News Talk Information
WLDR-FM	101.9 FM	Traverse City	N Content Marketing, LLC	Silent
WLEN	103.9 FM	Adrian	Lenawee Broadcasting Company	Adult contemporary
WLEW	1340 AM	Bad Axe	Thumb Broadcasting, Inc.	Country
WLEW-FM	102.1 FM	Bad Axe	Thumb Broadcasting, Inc.	Classic hits
WLFN	88.9 FM	Flint	Educational Media Foundation	Contemporary Christian
WLGH	88.1 FM	Leroy Township	Smile FM	Contemporary Christian
WLHT-FM	95.7 FM	Grand Rapids	Townsquare Media of Grand Rapids, Inc.	Hot adult contemporary
WLJD	107.9 FM	Charlevoix	Good News Media, Inc.	Religious
WLJN	1400 AM	Elmwood Township	Good News Media, Inc.	Religious
WLJN-FM	89.9 FM	Traverse City	Good News Media, Inc.	Religious
WLJW	1370 AM	Cadillac	Good News Media, Inc. (Old Board)	Religious
WLJW-FM	95.9 FM	Fife Lake	Good News Media, Inc.	Contemporary Christian
WLKB	89.1 FM	Bay City	Educational Media Foundation	Contemporary Christian
WLKM-FM	95.9 FM	Three Rivers	Impact Radio, LLC	Adult contemporary
WLLZ	106.7 FM	Detroit	iHM Licenses, LLC	Classic rock
WLMI	92.9 FM	Grand Ledge	Midwest Communications, Inc.	Classic hits
WLMN	89.7 FM	Manistee	Interlochen Center for the Arts	News Talk Information
WLNZ	89.7 FM	Lansing	Lansing Community College	News Talk Information
WLQV	1500 AM	Detroit	Caron Broadcasting, Inc.	Religious
WLUN	100.9 FM	Pinconning	Michigan Radio Communications, LLC	Sports (FSR)
WLXT	96.3 FM	Petoskey	MacDonald Garber Broadcasting, Inc	Adult contemporary
WLXV	96.7 FM	Cadillac	MacDonald Garber Broadcasting, Inc	Country
WMAX	1440 AM	Bay City	AM Media Services, L.L.C.	Catholic
WMAX-FM	96.1 FM	Holland	iHM Licenses, LLC	Sports (FSR)
WMBN	1340 AM	Petoskey	MacDonald Garber Broadcasting, Inc	Sports (FSR)
WMCQ	91.7 FM	Muskegon	American Family Association	Religious
WMGC-FM	105.1 FM	Detroit	Beasley Media Group, LLC	Rhythmic AC
WMHW-FM	91.5 FM	Mount Pleasant	Central Michigan University	Adult album alternative
WMIC	660 AM	Sandusky	Sanilac Broadcasting Company	Classic country
WMIM	98.3 FM	Luna Pier	Cumulus Licensing LLC	Country
WMIQ	1450 AM	Iron Mountain	AMC Partners Escanaba, LLC	Oldies
WMJC	91.9 FM	Richland	West Central Michigan Media Ministries	Religious
WMJH	810 AM	Rockford	Cano's Broadcasting, LLC	Regional Mexican
WMJO	97.3 FM	Essexville	The MacDonald Broadcasting Company	Adult hits
WMJT	96.7 FM	Mcmillan	Two Hearted Media, LLC	Hot adult contemporary
WMJZ-FM	101.5 FM	Gaylord	45 North Media Inc	Adult hits
WMKC	102.9 FM	Indian River	Black Diamond Broadcast Holdings, LLC.	Country
WMKD	105.5 FM	Pickford	Sovereign Communications, LLC	Country
WMKM	1440 AM	Inkster	Great Lakes Radio - Detroit, LLC	Gospel
WMKT	1270 AM	Charlevoix	MacDonald Garber Broadcasting, Inc	News Talk Information
WMLM	1520 AM	St. Louis	Krol Communications Inc.	Silent
WMLQ	97.7 FM	Manistee	Synergy Lakeshore Licenses, LLC	News Talk Information
WMLY-LP	93.1 FM	Marshall	Marshall Christian Radio	Christian
WMLZ-LP	107.9 FM	Temperance	Bedford Public Schools	Silent
WMMI	830 AM	Shepherd	Latitude Media, LLC	Classic country
WMMQ	94.9 FM	East Lansing	Townsquare License, LLC	Classic rock
WMOM	102.7 FM	Pentwater	Hit Radio Media, LLC	Hot adult contemporary
WMPA	93.1 FM	Ferrysburg	West Central Michigan Media Ministries	Silent
WMPC	1230 AM	Lapeer	The Calvary Bible Church of Lapeer	Religious
WMPL	920 AM	Hancock	J & J Broadcasting, Inc.	Oldies
WMPX	1490 AM	Midland	Black Diamond Broadcast Group, LLC	Adult contemporary
WMQT	107.7 FM	Ishpeming	Keweenaw Bay Indian Community Native American Tribe	Hot adult contemporary
WMRP-LP	104.7 FM	Mundy Township	SWC Concerts, Inc	Christian country
WMRR	101.7 FM	Muskegon Heights	iHM Licenses, LLC	Classic rock
WMRX-FM	97.7 FM	Beaverton	Black Diamond Broadcast Group, LLC	Adult contemporary
WMSD	90.9 FM	Rose Township	Bible Baptist Church of Lupton, Michigan	Religious
WMTE-FM	101.5 FM	Manistee	45 North Media Inc	Adult hits
WMTU-FM	91.9 FM	Houghton	Michigan Technological University	Variety
WMUK	102.1 FM	Kalamazoo	Western Michigan University	Public radio / News/talk / Jazz
WMUS	107.9 FM	Muskegon	iHM Licenses, LLC	Country
WMUZ	1200 AM	Taylor	WMUZ Radio, Inc.	Religious
WMUZ-FM	103.5 FM	Detroit	WMUZ Radio, Inc.	Religious
WMXD	92.3 FM	Detroit	iHM Licenses, LLC	Urban adult contemporary
WNBI-LP	107.9 FM	New Buffalo	New Buffalo Area Schools	Variety
WNBY	1450 AM	Newberry	Sovereign Communications, LLC	Classic country
WNBY-FM	93.9 FM	Newberry	Sovereign Communications, LLC	Classic hits
WNFA	88.3 FM	Port Huron	Ross Bible Church	Christian teaching/worship
WNFR	90.7 FM	Sandusky	Ross Bible Church	Christian adult contemporary
WNGE	99.5 FM	Negaunee	Marquette Radio, LLC	Active rock
WNHG	89.7 FM	Grand Rapids	West Central Michigan Media Ministries	Religious
WNIC	100.3 FM	Dearborn	iHM Licenses, LLC	Adult contemporary
WNIL	1290 AM	Niles	Marion R. Williams	Adult contemporary
WNMC-FM	90.7 FM	Traverse City	Northwestern Michigan College	Variety
WNMU-FM	90.1 FM	Marquette	Board of Control, Northern Michigan University	Public radio
WNOA-LP	103.9 FM	Marquette	Claves Regni Ministries, Inc. dba Northern Apostle Radio	Catholic
WNUC-LP	96.7 FM	Detroit	North End Woodward Community Coalition	Variety
WNWN	98.5 FM	Coldwater	Midwest Communications, Inc	Country
WNWZ	1410 AM	Grand Rapids	Townsquare Media of Grand Rapids, Inc.	Urban contemporary
WNZK	690 AM	Dearborn Heights	Birach Broadcasting Corporation	World Ethnic
WOAP	1080 AM	Owosso	Cano's Broadcasting, LLC	Regional Mexican
WOAS	88.5 FM	Ontonagon	Ontonagon Area School District	Educational
WOBE	100.7 FM	Crystal Falls	Results Broadcasting of Iron Mountain, Inc.	Pop Contemporary Hit Radio
WOCR	89.1 FM	Olivet	Board of Trustees/Olivet College	Variety
WOES	91.3 FM	Ovid-Elsie	Ovid-Elsie Area Schools	World Ethnic
WOFR	89.5 FM	Schoolcraft	Family Stations, Inc.	Religious
WOLV	97.7 FM	Houghton	Houghton Community Broadcasting Corporation	Classic hits
WOLW	91.1 FM	Cadillac	Northern Christian Radio, Inc.	Contemporary Christian
WOMC	104.3 FM	Detroit	Audacy License, LLC	Classic hits
WOOD	1300 AM	Grand Rapids	iHM Licenses, LLC	News Talk Information
WOOD-FM	106.9 FM	Muskegon	iHM Licenses, LLC	News Talk Information
WORW	91.9 FM	Port Huron	Port Huron Area Schools	Pop Contemporary Hit Radio
WOUF	750 AM	Petoskey	N Content Marketing, LLC	Easy listening
WOVI	89.5 FM	Novi	Board of Education, Novi Community School District	Adult album alternative
WOWE	98.9 FM	Vassar	Praestantia Broadcasting, Inc.	Urban contemporary
WPCJ	91.1 FM	Pittsford	Pittsford Educational Broadcasting Foundation	Religious
WPHM	1380 AM	Port Huron	Liggett Communications, L.L.C.	News Talk Information
WPHN	90.5 FM	Gaylord	Northern Christian Radio, Inc.	Contemporary Christian
WPHS	89.1 FM	Warren	Warren Consolidated Schools	Alternative
WPNW	1260 AM	Zeeland	Lanser Broadcasting Corporation	Worship music
WPON	1460 AM	Walled Lake	Birach Broadcasting Corporation	Oldies
WPRJ	101.7 FM	Coleman	Spirit Communications, Inc.	Contemporary Christian
WPRR	1680 AM	Ada	Goodrich Radio, LLC	Urban adult contemporary
WPRR-FM	90.1 FM	Clyde Township	WPRR, Inc.	Educational
WQAR-LP	95.7 FM	Addison	Addison Community Schools	Classic rock
WQBH-LP	102.9 FM	St. Joseph	Marriage And Family Commitment, Inc.	Religious Teaching
WQBX	104.9 FM	Alma	Jacom, Inc.	Hot adult contemporary
WQHH	96.5 FM	Dewitt	The MacDonald Broadcasting Company	Urban contemporary
WQHN	100.9 FM	East Jordan	Northern Christian Radio	Contemporary Christian
WQKL	107.1 FM	Ann Arbor	Cumulus Licensing LLC	Adult album alternative
WQLB	103.3 FM	Tawas City	Carroll Broadcasting, Inc.	Classic hits
WQON	100.3 FM	Grayling	Blarney Stone Broadcasting, Inc.	Album oriented rock
WQTE	95.3 FM	Adrian	Southeast Michigan Media, Inc.	Country
WQTX	92.1 FM	St. Johns	Midwest Communications, Inc.	Rhythmic AC
WQUS	103.1 FM	Lapeer	Townsquare Media of Flint, Inc.	Sports
WQXC-FM	100.9 FM	Allegan	Forum Communications, Inc.	Oldies
WQXO	1400 AM	Munising	Educational Media Foundation	Contemporary Christian (K-Love)
WQYQ	1400 AM	St. Joseph	WSJM, Inc.	Sports
WRCI	1520 AM	Three Rivers	Impact Radio, LLC	Classic country
WRCJ-FM	90.9 FM	Detroit	Detroit Classical And Jazz Educational Radio LLC	Classical/Jazz
WRCL	93.7 FM	Frankenmuth	Townsquare Media of Flint, Inc.	Rhythmic Contemporary Hit Radio
WRDS-LP	104.3 FM	Roscommon	Soul's Harbor Assembly of God Church	Southern gospel
WRDT	560 AM	Monroe	WMUZ Radio, Inc.	Religious
WRFH-LP	101.7 FM	Hillsdale	Hillsdale College	News/Talk
WRGZ	96.7 FM	Rogers City	WATZ Radio, Inc.	Mainstream rock
WRHC-LP	106.7 FM	Three Oaks	Harbor Arts	Variety
WRHZ-LP	93.5 FM	Three Oaks	Radio Harbor Country	Variety
WRIF	101.1 FM	Detroit	Beasley Media Group, LLC	Active rock
WRKR	107.7 FM	Portage	Townsquare License, LLC	Classic rock
WRPP	92.7 FM	Manistique	Aurora Media, LLC	Classic rock
WRRA-FM	97.5 FM	Bridgman	WSJM Inc	Country
WRSR	103.9 FM	Owosso	Krol Communications Inc.	Classic rock
WRSX	91.3 FM	Port Huron	St. Clair County Regional Education Service Agency	Public radio
WRUP	98.3 FM	Palmer	mediaBrew Communications Marquette LLC	Classic rock
WRVU-LP	92.3 FM	Grand Rapids	Iglesia Del Rey	Spanish religious
WSAE	106.9 FM	Spring Arbor	Spring Arbor University	Contemporary Christian
WSAG	104.1 FM	Linwood	MacDonald Broadcasting Company	Soft adult contemporary
WSAM	1400 AM	Saginaw	The MacDonald Broadcasting Company	Soft adult contemporary
WSAQ	107.1 FM	Port Huron	Liggett Communications, L.L.C.	Country
WSBX	94.5 FM	Mackinaw City	Whiskey Sours Broadcasting and Productions, LLC	Classic hits
WSDP	88.1 FM	Plymouth	Plymouth-Canton Community Schools	Adult contemporary
WSDS	1480 AM	Salem Township	Vazquez Broadcasting Corporation	Spanish Variety
WSFP	88.1 FM	Harrisville	Michigan Community Radio	Contemporary Christian
WSFT-LP	105.5 FM	Berrien Springs	Life Search Radio, Inc.	Christian
WSGW	790 AM	Saginaw	Alpha Media Licensee LLC	News Talk Information
WSGW-FM	100.5 FM	Carrollton	Alpha Media Licensee LLC	News Talk Information
WSHJ	88.3 FM	Southfield	Board of Education of Southfield Public Schools	Urban contemporary
WSHN	89.3 FM	Munising	Christianradiobroadcasting.org, Inc.	Contemporary Christian
WSIS	88.7 FM	Riverside	Smile FM	Contemporary Christian
WSJB-LP	96.9 FM	St. Joseph	Saint Joseph Educational Broadcasters	Christian
WSJH	103.7 FM	Hubbardston	Smile FM	Contemporary Christian
WSJM-FM	94.9 FM	Benton Harbor	WSJM, Inc.	News Talk Sports
WSLI	1480 AM	Kentwood	Smile FM	Contemporary Christian
WSLI-FM	90.9 FM	Belding	Smile FM	Contemporary Christian
WSMB	89.3 FM	Harbor Beach	Smile FM	Contemporary Christian
WSMF	88.1 FM	Monroe	Northland Community Broadcasters	Contemporary Christian
WSMK	99.1 FM	Buchanan	Marion R. Williams	Rhythmic Contemporary Hit Radio
WSMO	91.9 FM	Mount Forest	Smile FM	Contemporary Christian
WSMZ	850 AM	Muskegon	Smile FM	Contemporary Christian
WSMZ-FM	88.3 FM	Crystal Valley	Smile FM	Contemporary Christian
WSNH-LP	103.7 FM	Grand Rapids	Iglesia Sanando Las Naciones	Spanish religious
WSNL	600 AM	Flint	Christian Broadcasting System, Ltd.	Religious
WSNX-FM	104.5 FM	Muskegon	iHM Licenses, LLC	Pop Contemporary Hit Radio
WSOO	1230 AM	Sault Ste. Marie	Sovereign Communications, LLC	Soft adult contemporary
WSPB	89.7 FM	Bedford	Holy Family Radio, Inc.	Catholic
WSRJ	105.5 FM	Honor	Good News Media, Inc.	Christian contemporary
WSRT	106.7 FM	Gaylord	MacDonald Garber Broadcasting, Inc.	Classic country
WSRW-FM	105.7 FM	Grand Rapids	iHM Licenses, LLC	Adult contemporary
WSUE	101.3 FM	Sault Ste. Marie	Sovereign Communications, LLC	Album oriented rock
WTAC	89.7 FM	Burton	Smile FM	Contemporary Christian
WTCK	90.9 FM	Charlevoix	Relevant Radio, Inc.	Catholic
WTCM	580 AM	Traverse City	WTCM Radio, Inc.	News Talk Information
WTCM-FM	103.5 FM	Traverse City	WTCM Radio, Inc.	Country
WTCY	88.3 FM	Greilickville	Relevant Radio, Inc.	Catholic
WTGV-FM	97.7 FM	Sandusky	Sanilac Broadcasting Company	Classic hits
WTHN	102.3 FM	Sault Ste. Marie	Northern Christian Radio, Inc.	Contemporary Christian
WTHS	89.9 FM	Holland	Hope College	Alternative
WTIQ	1490 AM	Manistique	AMC Partners Escanaba, LLC	Classic country
WTKA	1050 AM	Ann Arbor	Cumulus Licensing LLC	Sports (ISN)
WTKG	1230 AM	Grand Rapids	iHM Licenses, LLC	News Talk Information
WTLI	89.3 FM	Bear Creek Township	Smile FM	Contemporary Christian
WTLZ	107.1 FM	Saginaw	Alpha Media Licensee LLC	Urban adult contemporary
WTNR	107.3 FM	Greenville	Radio License Holding CBC, LLC	Country
WTOU	96.5 FM	Portage	Midwest Communications, Inc	Modern AC
WTPP-LP	93.3 FM	Gobles	New Creation Station, Inc.	Christian
WTRC-FM	95.3 FM	Niles	Pathfinder Communications Corporation	News Talk Information
WTRK	90.9 FM	Freeland	Educational Media Foundation	Contemporary Christian
WTRV	100.5 FM	Walker	Townsquare Media of Grand Rapids, Inc.	Soft adult contemporary
WTRX	1330 AM	Flint	Radio License Holding CBC, LLC	Sports (ISN)
WTVB	1590 AM	Coldwater	Midwest Communications, Inc	Classic hits
WTWS	92.1 FM	Houghton Lake	Black Diamond Broadcast Group, LLC	Country
WTZM	106.1 FM	Tawas City	Carroll Enterprises, Inc.	Hot adult contemporary
WUCX-FM	90.1 FM	Bay City	Central Michigan University	Variety
WUFL	93.1 FM	Detroit	Family Life Broadcasting System	Contemporary Christian
WUFN	96.7 FM	Albion	Family Life Broadcasting System	Contemporary Christian
WUGM-LP	106.1 FM	Muskegon	West Michigan Community Help Network	R&B Oldies/Dance
WUGN	99.7 FM	Midland	Family Life Broadcasting System	Contemporary Christian
WUNN	1110 AM	Mason	Family Life Broadcasting System	Contemporary Christian
WUOM	91.7 FM	Ann Arbor	Regents of the University of Michigan	News Talk Information
WUPF	107.3 FM	Powers	AMC Partners Escanaba, LLC	Classic rock
WUPG	96.7 FM	Republic	AMC Partners Escanaba, LLC	Classic country
WUPJ	90.9 FM	Escanaba	West Central Michigan Media Ministries	Religious
WUPK	94.1 FM	Marquette	Marquette Radio, LLC	Soft adult contemporary
WUPM	106.9 FM	Ironwood	Baroka Broadcasting, Inc.	Hot adult contemporary
WUPN	95.1 FM	Paradise	TSE Broadcasting LLC	Classic hits
WUPS	98.5 FM	Harrison	Black Diamond Broadcast Group, LLC	Classic hits
WUPT	100.3 FM	Gwinn	AMC Partners Escanaba, LLC	Classic hits
WUPX	91.5 FM	Marquette	Board of Trustees of Northern Michigan University	Variety
WUPY	101.1 FM	Ontonagon	SNRN Broadcasting, Inc.	Country
WUPZ	94.9 FM	Chocolay Township	AMC Partners Escanaba, LLC	Pop Contemporary Hit Radio
WUVS-LP	103.7 FM	Muskegon	West Michigan Community Help Network	Urban
WVAC-FM	107.9 FM	Adrian	Adrian College	Pop Contemporary Hit Radio
WVAV	91.5 FM	Vicksburg	Holy Family Radio	Catholic
WVBH-LP	105.3 FM	Benton Harbor	Flats Economic Development Corp.	Urban
WVBI-LP	100.1 FM	Beaver Island	Preservation Association of Beaver Island	Variety
WVCM	91.5 FM	Iron Mountain	VCY America, Inc.	Conservative religious
WVCN	104.3 FM	Baraga	Keweenaw Bay Broadcasting, Inc.	Conservative religious
WVEX-LP	105.3 FM	Midland	Tri-Rock Media Communications Corporation, Inc.	World News/Talk
WVFC-LP	102.1 FM	Stephenson	AMDG Radio, Inc.	Christian
WVFM	106.5 FM	Kalamazoo	Midwest Communications, Inc.	Adult hits
WVFN	730 AM	East Lansing	Townsquare License, LLC	Sports (ESPN)
WVGR	104.1 FM	Grand Rapids	Regents of the University of Michigan	News Talk Information
WVHF	1140 AM	Kentwood	Holy Family Radio	Catholic
WVIB	100.1 FM	Holton	Radio License Holding CBC, LLC	Urban adult contemporary
WVMV	91.5 FM	China Township	Smile FM	Contemporary Christian
WWBN	101.5 FM	Tuscola	Townsquare Media of Flint, Inc.	Mainstream rock
WWBR	100.9 FM	Big Rapids	Mentor Partners, Inc.	Country
WWCK	1570 AM	Flint	Cumulus Licensing LLC	Silent
WWCK-FM	105.5 FM	Flint	Cumulus Licensing LLC	Pop Contemporary Hit Radio
WWCM	96.9 FM	Standish	Central Michigan University	Variety
WWDK	94.1 FM	Jackson	Midwest Communications, Inc.	Country
WWJ	950 AM	Detroit	Audacy License, LLC	All news
WWKR	94.1 FM	Hart	Synergy Lakeshore Licenses, LLC	Classic rock
WWMK	106.3 FM	Onaway	Black Diamond Broadcast Holdings, LLC.	Soft oldies
WWMN	1110 AM	Petoskey	Mitten News LLC	Silent
WWSJ	1580 AM	St. Johns	Kingdom Builders of Larlen LLC	Gospel
WWSN	92.5 FM	Newaygo	Radio License Holding CBC, LLC	Adult contemporary
WWSS	95.3 FM	Tuscarora Township	Black Diamond Broadcasting Holdings, LLC	Classic rock
WWTH	100.7 FM	Oscoda	Edwards Communications LC	Classic rock
WWWW-FM	102.9 FM	Ann Arbor	Cumulus Licensing LLC	Country
WXHR-LP	103.5 FM	Hillman	Hillman Community Radio	Variety
WXLA	1180 AM	Dimondale	The MacDonald Broadcasting Company	Soft adult contemporary
WXOU	88.3 FM	Auburn Hills	Oakland University	Educational
WXTF-LP	97.9 FM	Harrisville	Alcona Music Project, Inc.	Variety
WXYT	1270 AM	Detroit	Audacy License, LLC	Sports
WXYT-FM	97.1 FM	Detroit	Audacy License, LLC	Sports (ISN)
WYBA	90.1 FM	Coldwater	Bible Broadcasting Network, Inc.	Conservative religious
WYBR	102.3 FM	Big Rapids	Mentor Partners, Inc.	Hot adult contemporary
WYCD	99.5 FM	Detroit	Audacy License, LLC	Country
WYCE	88.1 FM	Wyoming	Grand Rapids Cable Access Center	Adult album alternative
WYGR	1530 AM	Wyoming	WYGR, LLC	Classic country
WYHA	102.9 FM	Grand Rapids	Bible Broadcasting Network, Inc.	Conservative religious
WYKX	104.7 FM	Escanaba	Aurora Media, LLC	Country
WYSS	99.5 FM	Sault Ste. Marie	Sovereign Communications, LLC	Pop Contemporary Hit Radio
WYTZ-FM	99.9 FM	Benton Harbor	WSJM, Inc.	Alternative rock
WYVN	92.7 FM	Saugatuck	Midwest Communications, Inc.	Classic hits
WZAM	970 AM	Ishpeming	Keweenaw Bay Indian Community Native American Tribe	Active rock
WZNL	94.3 FM	Norway	AMC Partners Escanaba, LLC	Soft adult contemporary
WZOX	1660 AM	Kalamazoo	Midwest Communications, Inc.	Urban adult contemporary
WZTC	104.5 FM	Traverse City	Playtime Media, LLC	Adult hits
WZTK	105.7 FM	Alpena	WATZ Radio, Inc.	Oldies
WZUU	92.5 FM	Mattawan	Forum Communications, Inc.	Mainstream rock

== Defunct ==
- WBNZ
- W8XWJ
- WHLS
- WHLX
- WKPR
- WLAW
- WLAW-FM
- WLLS
- WMQU
- WQLR
- WRWW-LP
- WWAO (1924-?)
