= Michigan Radio Network =

News service

- Type: Radio network
- Country: United States

Ownership
- Owner: Learfield Communications

History
- Closed: March 31, 2016
- Former names: Michigan News Network

Coverage
- Availability: state of Michigan

The Michigan Radio Network (or MRN) was a satellite-distributed news service that provides actualities, newscasts, and talk shows to affiliates in Michigan. It was most recently owned by Learfield Communications and had headquarters in Lansing, Michigan. Over the years MRN had been around in various forms and names, and is a sister network to the Michigan Farm Radio Network.

== History ==
The Michigan Radio Network can trace its roots to the Michigan Regional Network, the first radio network in Michigan.

The modern incarnation of the Michigan Radio Network began in 1970 with the formation of the Michigan Farm Radio Network (MFRN) in Milan. The network that came to be known as the Michigan Radio Network was first called the Michigan News Network (MNN). The MFRN and MNN were owned by a company called the Great Lakes Radio group, headed up by Jim Rayl.

The Michigan News Network split from the Great Lakes Radio group in the 1980s and moved to Caro. The MNN was bought by former Detroit Tiger Denny McLain and headquarters moved to Lansing. McLain, convicted of embezzlement and stealing from workers pensions, went bankrupt. The network was sold to back to Jim Rayl, still called the Michigan News Network, and now owned by Full Circle Broadcasting.

Full Circle sold the MNN to Grosse Pointe Farms based Saga Communications, headed by Ed Christian. The name of the network was changed to the Michigan Radio Network.

The Michigan Radio Network (MRN) and MFRN was sold to Learfield Communications in December, 2014.

In March 2016, it was announced that Learfield would end the Michigan Radio Network on March 31 due to financial reasons, and sell MRN's Lansing studios.

== Programs ==
- Michigan Radio Network News, hourly one and two-minute newscasts.
- Michigan Radio Network Sports, morning and afternoon sports updates.
- Capital Pressroom with Rob Baykian, a thirty-minute weekly public affairs program.
- Outdoor Magazine with Mike Avery, a three-hour weekend program about hunting and fishing, originating from WSGW.

=== Special events ===
The Michigan Radio Network covered events related to the Michigan Legislature, including the annual State of the State address and election night coverage.

== Affiliates ==
- WAAM, Ann Arbor
- WAGN (AM), Menominee
- WAKV, Otsego
- WATT, Cadillac
- WATZ-FM, Alpena
- WBCH (AM), Hastings
- WBCK, Battle Creek
- WBCM (FM), Boyne City
- WBMI, West Branch
- WBRN (AM), Big Rapids
- WCBY, Cheboygan
- WCCW-FM, Traverse City
- WCCY, Houghton
- WCSY-FM, South Haven
- WDBC, Escanaba
- WDMJ, Marquette
- WGHN (AM), Grand Haven
- WGLM, Greenville
- WHTO, Iron Mountain
- WHYB, Menominee
- WIDL, Caro
- WILS, Lansing
- WIOS, Tawas City
- WKHM (AM), Jackson
- WKJC, Tawas City
- WKYO, Caro
- WLDN, Ludington
- WMOM, Pentwater
- WNBY (AM), Newberry
- WNGE, Negaunee
- WPHM, Port Huron
- WQXO, Munising
- WRCI, Three Rivers
- WRGZ, Rogers City
- WSAQ, Port Huron
- WSGW (AM), Saginaw
- WSOO, Sault Ste Marie
- WTIQ, Manistique
- WTKG, Grand Rapids
- WUPY, Ontonagon
- WXLA, Lansing
- WZTK, Alpena
