= WBCH =

WBCH may refer to:

- WBCH (AM), a radio station (1220 AM) licensed to Hastings, Michigan, United States
- WBCH-FM, a radio station (100.1 FM) licensed to Hastings, Michigan, United States
