= WBSV =

WBSV may refer to:

- WBSV-LP, a low-power radio station (93.3 FM) licensed to serve Berrien Springs, Michigan, United States
- WFTT-TV, a television station (channel 25, virtual 62) licensed to serve Venice, Florida, United States, which held the call sign WBSV-TV from 1987 to 2000
