= WRSR =

- Owosso, Michigan; United States
- Broadcast area: Flint, Michigan
- Frequency: 103.9 MHz
- Branding: 103.9 The Fox

Programming
- Format: Classic rock
- Affiliations: Detroit Lions Radio Network

Ownership
- Owner: Krol Communications Inc.

History
- First air date: 1965 (as WOAP-FM)
- Former call signs: WAHV (2/5/96-5/15/98); WMZX (1/15/89-2/5/96); WOAP-FM (1965-1/15/89)
- Call sign meaning: WRSR-FM: We aRe Solid Rock

Technical information
- Licensing authority: FCC
- Facility ID: 41681
- Class: A
- ERP: 2,850 watts
- HAAT: 147 meters (482 ft)
- Transmitter coordinates: 42°59′44″N 83°59′33″W

Links
- Public license information: Public file; LMS
- Webcast: Listen Live
- Website: classicfox.com

WRSR (103.9 FM, "The Fox") is a radio station broadcasting a classic rock format. Licensed to Owosso, Michigan, it first began broadcasting in 1965 under the WOAP-FM call sign. Its transmitter is located east of Owosso, while its studios are located in Flint Township. It also broadcasts Detroit Lions games.

== History ==
The original WOAP-FM began broadcasting in April 1948 at 103.1 on the FM dial. Although the station's owner, The Owosso Argus-Press, which also owned AM station WOAP 1080, heavily promoted its new FM station, WOAP-FM was a failure and went off the air by 1953. WOAP-FM resurfaced on its current 103.9 frequency on December 2, 1965. It served as a simulcast of the full-service/MOR AM station and continued the AM's programming after AM sign-off as well as broadcasting local high-school sports. Eventually WOAP (AM) and WOAP-FM separated programming completely, with the FM station taking a beautiful music format.

In 1987, the Federal Communications Commission's concerns about concentration of media ownership in the Owosso area at that time forced the Argus-Press to sell WOAP-AM-FM.

In 1989, WOAP-FM changed its call letters to WMZX and its format to adult contemporary.

In the late 1990s, the station began targeting the Flint market more aggressively. In 1998, 103.9 FM switched from classic hits as WAHV "The Wave" to soft AC as WRSR "Soft Rock 103.9." WRSR originally carried the syndicated Delilah love-songs show at night, but later switched to a simulcast of Detroit station WNIC-FM's "Pillow Talk" show hosted by Alan Almond after crosstown rival WCRZ dropped its own local love-songs show in favor of Delilah. Following the failure of the AC format, WRSR switched to its current format on September 14, 2000 at noon.

In September 2011, WRSR owner Cumulus received permission to acquire Citadel Broadcasting on the condition that they spin off three radio stations including WRSR. WRSR was operated by Potential Broadcasting trust until the station was sold. The local Citadel stations Cumulus acquired are WFBE and WTRX. Potential moved the WRSR studios and offices from the Cumulus Flint cluster's base of operations in the Flint Radio Center on Taylor Drive in Mundy Township to the old WFBE location on Miller Road in Flint Township. Cumulus moved WFBE and WTRX from Miller Road to Taylor Drive.

On August 28, 2012 the station was sold to Rod Krol of Krol Communications which also owns WJSZ in Ashley and WMLM in St. Louis. Plans are for the new owner to take over in the fourth quarter of 2012 and he is satisfied with its current makeup. The sale of WRSR to Krol was consummated on December 1, 2012, at a purchase price of $1.15 million.

In March 2016, Jeremy Fenech was brought on as Program Director and afternoon host, and one of the first things he did was unplug the satellites ensuring 100% local programming and content, with no syndication. In addition to the changes in the programming department, Krol Communications Inc also invested in equipment and technology for the studio and the broadcast chain which has improved the quality of the signal dramatically. Since then, the station has continually and consistently enjoyed ratings success.

WRSR became the home of local radio celebrity Johnny Burke in March 2017. Burke most recently hosted the morning show at WHNN in Bay City prior to an abrupt format change which left him jobless. WHNN's format change left WRSR the only station in the Flint market playing hits from the 1960s through 1980s. Joining Burke is former WHNN news director Hal Maas, who will do news updates for both WRSR and WJSZ. Burke's new show runs from 5am to 10am weekday mornings.

In 2021, 103.9 The Fox became the Flint affiliate for the Detroit Lions Radio Network, replacing longtime affiliate WTRX.
