= WPLB =

WPLB may refer to:

- WJMP (AM), a radio station (1070 AM) licensed to serve Plattsburgh, New York, United States, which held the call sign WPLB from 2017 to 2021
- WSLP, a radio station (100.7 FM) licensed to serve Plattsburgh West, New York, which held the call sign WPLB from 2012 to 2016
- WGLM-FM, a radio station (106.3 FM) licensed to serve Lakeview, Michigan, United States, which held the call sign WPLB-FM from 1993 to 2000
- WGLM (AM), a radio station (1380 AM) licensed to serve Greenville, Michigan, which held the call sign WPLB from 1960 to 2000
- WTNR (FM), a radio station (107.3 FM) licensed to serve Greenville, Michigan, which held the call sign WPLB-FM from 1962 to 1989
