= WLLJ =

WLLJ may refer to:

- WLLJ-LP, a low-power radio station (107.7 FM) licensed to serve Cape Coral, Florida, United States
- WJLJ, a radio station (103.1 FM) licensed to serve Etowah, Tennessee, United States, which held the call sign WLLJ from 1999 to 2015
- WGTO, a radio station (910 AM) licensed to serve Cassopolis, Michigan, United States, which held the call sign WLLJ from 1986 to 1995
