= WCZY =

WCZY may refer to:

- WCZY-FM, a radio station in Mt. Pleasant, Michigan located at 104.3 FM
- WCZY-FM (Detroit), the callsigns for a former radio station in Detroit, Michigan located at 95.5 FM, now known as WKQI
