= WAGN =

WAGN may refer to:

- West Anglia Great Northern, a former franchise operator of commuter train services in England
- WAGN (AM), a radio station (1340 AM) licensed to Menominee, Michigan, United States
- Wagn (software), free/open source software project originated in Eugene, Oregon, United States
