= WION (disambiguation) =

WION is an Indian multinational English language television news channel headquartered in New Delhi.

WION may also refer to:

- WION (AM), a radio station in Michigan, U.S.
- Raden Sadjad Airport, ICAO code for the airport on the Natuna archipelago in Indonesia
