= WSCG =

WSCG may refer to:

- WSCG (TV), a television station (channel 35, virtual 34) licensed to serve Baxley, Georgia, United States
- WSCG-LD, a low-power television station (channel 14) licensed to serve Beaufort, South Carolina, United States
- WLUB, a radio station (105.7 FM) licensed to serve Augusta, Georgia, which held the call sign WSCG from 2013 to 2016
- WSCG, former call sign for radio station WGLM in Ionia, Michigan
