= WRHC =

WRHC may refer to:

- WRHC (AM), a radio station (1550 AM) licensed to Coral Gables, Florida, United States
- WRHC-LP, a low-power radio station (106.7 FM) licensed to Three Oaks, Michigan, United States
- WZAZ, a radio station (1400 AM) licensed to Jacksonville, Florida, United States which held the WRHC call sign from 1949 to 1972
