= WDLP =

WDLP may refer to:

- WDLP-LP, a low-power radio station (93.1 FM) licensed to Belding, Michigan, United States
- WDLP-CD, a defunct television station (channel 21) formerly licensed to Miami/Pompano Beach, Florida, United States
- WDDV (AM), a defunct radio station (590 AM) formerly licensed to Panama City, Florida, which held the call sign WDLP from 1940 until 1987
- WPCF, a radio station (1290 AM) licensed to Panama City Beach, Florida, which held the call sign WDLP from 1994 to 2000
