= WHCH =

- Custer, Michigan; United States
- Broadcast area: Ludington / Manistee
- Frequency: 99.9 MHz
- Branding: 99.9 WHCH

Programming
- Format: Classic hits

Ownership
- Owner: Chris Nicholas; (Nicholas Broadcasting, LLC)
- Sister stations: WMOM

History
- First air date: June 12, 2023
- Call sign meaning: Country Hits (original format)

Technical information
- Licensing authority: FCC
- Facility ID: 762391
- Class: A
- ERP: 3,000 watts
- HAAT: 91 metres (299 ft)
- Transmitter coordinates: 43°58′21″N 86°14′59″W

Links
- Public license information: Public file; LMS

WHCH (99.9 FM) is a commercial FM radio station licensed to Custer, Michigan, serving the Ludington and Manistee areas of West Michigan. The station is owned by Chris Nicholas (through licensee Nicholas Broadcasting) and broadcasts a Classic hits radio format.

== History ==
The allocation for the 99.9 MHz frequency in Custer was established by the Federal Communications Commission (FCC) as part of Auction 109 in 2021. The winning bid of $51,000 was placed by Hit Radio Media, LLC, a group that already operated within the West Michigan market.

The radio station came on the air on June 12, 2023. The first song broadcast on the station was "God Bless the USA" by Lee Greenwood. For much of its recent history, the station operated under the ownership of Hit Radio Media, led by Jim Chesley, Steve Leach, and Jeff Lobdell. During this period, the station was known as "Hot Country Hits 99.9," catering to the local agricultural and coastal communities with a mix of 1990s and contemporary country music.

In late 2025, Hit Radio Media reached an agreement to sell WHCH, along with sister station WMOM (102.7 FM) in Pentwater, to Chris Nicholas for approximately $47,558.
