= WMAM =

Coordinates: 45°06′02″N 87°37′30″W

- Marinette, Wisconsin; United States
- Broadcast area: Green Bay, Wisconsin
- Frequency: 570 kHz
- Branding: Sportsradio 570 & 104.5

Programming
- Format: Sports
- Affiliations: ESPN Radio; Milwaukee Brewers Radio Network

Ownership
- Owner: Radio Plus Bay Cities, LLC
- Sister stations: WAGN, WHYB, WLST, WSFQ

History
- First air date: October 8, 1939

Technical information
- Licensing authority: FCC
- Facility ID: 40149
- Class: D
- Power: 250 watts day 100 watts night
- Translator: 104.5 W283DD (Marinette)

Links
- Public license information: Public file; LMS
- Webcast: Listen Live
- Website: WMAM Online

WMAM (570 AM) is a class D radio station in Marinette, Wisconsin, serving the Marinette/Menominee, Michigan area. It operates omnidirectionally with a daytime power of 250 watts and a reduced nighttime power of 100 watts.

Although presently classified as a Class D station, this station was originally classified as a "Class C [Class IV; Local] station 'grandfathered' as operating on a Class B [Class III; Regional] channel" one of only two such stations in the U.S. Official FCC license note: "CLASS IV ON REGIONAL CHANNEL; SEE §73.29"

WMAM currently carries ESPN Radio.

== History ==
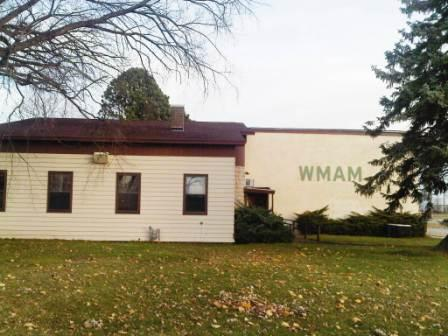
The radio station in 2011.

The call letters WMAM were previously assigned to a radio station in Beaumont, Texas, from August 1922 until October 1923.

WMAM in Marinette started in 1939, where the call letters reportedly stand for "Marinette and Menominee," or, "Wisconsin Michigan Air Messenger."

WMAM filed for a television license in July 1952, as WMBV-TV channel 11. By 1959, WMBV-TV moved to Green Bay and became WLUK-TV.

=== Ownership ===
- 1939: M & M Broadcasting, Inc.
- 1956: Guild Films Co. purchases both WMAM and WMBV-TV
- (Year Unknown): Quicksilver Broadcasting, LLC
- 2006: Armada Media – Menominee, Inc. a.k.a. Armada Media Corporation
- 2014: Radio Plus Bay Cities, LLC

=== Personnel ===
A notable personality at WMAM was Howard Emich, who worked at WMAM from 1940 to 1980. Known as "Marinette’s Newsman", he delivered over 10,000 news broadcasts and was inducted into the Wisconsin Broadcasters Association Hall of Fame in 1998.
