= WMHW-FM =

Radio station in Mount Pleasant, Michigan

Coordinates: 43.5759°N 84.7747°W

- Mount Pleasant, Michigan; United States
- Broadcast area: Central Michigan/Tri-Cities, Michigan
- Frequency: 91.5 MHz (HD Radio)
- Branding: The Mountain 91.5

Programming
- Format: Adult album alternative
- Subchannels: HD1: Analog simulcast; HD2: Rhythmic contemporary "The Beat"
- Affiliations: Michigan Radio Network (News and Sports Updates)

Ownership
- Owner: Central Michigan University

History
- First air date: 1971
- Call sign meaning: Wilbur Moore Hall Wireless

Technical information
- Licensing authority: FCC
- Facility ID: 9910
- Class: C3
- ERP: 9,100 watts
- HAAT: 164 meters
- Translators: 101.1 W266BU (Mount Pleasant, relays HD2)

Links
- Public license information: Public file; LMS
- Webcast: Listen Live; Listen Live (HD2)
- Website: wmhw.org

WMHW-FM, "The Mountain 91.5," is the student-operated college radio station for Central Michigan University, located in Mount Pleasant, Michigan. The call letters stand for "Wilbur Moore Hall Wireless", a reference to the station's studios being located in Wilbur Moore Hall on the CMU campus. The station is under the auspices of CMU's College of Communication and Fine Arts, and is operated by students from the School of Broadcast and Cinematic Arts.

The station changed from Modern Rock Radio 91.5 to Moore Rock Radio 91.5 on October 1, 2012. The biggest change is the inclusion of more mainstream rock music to their song selection.

WMHW is the flagship station for CMU Women's Basketball, and Mt. Pleasant High School Football. WMHW Sports also covers select CMU Softball and CMU Baseball games and CMU Volleyball home games.

In 2006, the Federal Communications Commission granted WMHW a power increase, slated to increase the station's signal from 340 watts to 13,000 watts. In addition, a new 450-foot transmitter tower was constructed, replacing the old 118-foot tower. The upgrade took place on September 28, 2007 at 11 am when CMU President Michael Rao gave the order to flip the switch to go to 13,000 watts.

WMHW now reaches Frankenmuth to the east, Big Rapids to the west, Cadillac to the north, St. Johns to the south and all points in between.

As of 2008, the radio station began broadcasting an HD Radio signal; HD1 is the same format as the original station, while HD2 was originally a blend of metal, hip-hop, and indie but has since switched to an Adult Alternative format known as "The Mountain." WMHW's HD2 signal is simulcast on translator W266BU 101.1 MHz in Mount Pleasant. As of April 26, 2010, both 91.5 and 101.1 are being run by Operations Manager Chad Roberts.

On February 15, 2016 WMHW changed their format to adult alternative as "The Mountain", which moved from the HD2 channel. At the same time, the HD2 channel switched to a rhythmic contemporary format, branded as "The Beat ".

== Previous logo ==
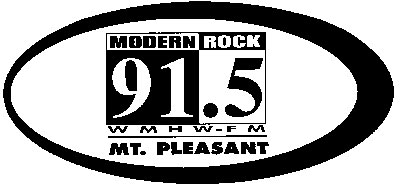

== See also ==
- Campus radio
- List of college radio stations in the United States
