= WDOW =

Dowagiac, Michigan; United States
- Frequency: 1440 kHz
- Branding: Fox Sports Radio

Programming
- Format: Sports
- Affiliations: Fox Sports Radio

Ownership
- Owner: Langford Broadcasting, LLC
- Sister stations: WGTO

History
- First air date: 1960
- Last air date: 2011
- Call sign meaning: Dowagiac, Michigan

Technical information
- Facility ID: 69803
- Class: D
- Power: 1,000 watts daytime); 89 watts nighttime

WDOW (1440 AM) was a radio station licensed to Dowagiac, Michigan, broadcasting a sports radio format. The station, which operated from 1960 to 2011, was last owned by Langford Broadcasting.

== History ==
In November 2010, the owners of WKPR in Kalamazoo paid $80,000 to Langford Broadcasting so that WDOW could go silent as part of WKPR's move from 1420 kHz to 1440 kHz. On March 24, 2011, the Federal Communications Commission cancelled WDOW's license and deleted the call sign from its database.
