= WSMK =

Coordinates: 41°49′23.5″N 86°17′2.6″W

- Buchanan, Michigan; United States
- Broadcast area: Michiana; South Bend metropolitan area
- Frequency: 99.1 MHz
- Branding: WSMK 99.1

Programming
- Format: Rhythmic contemporary

Ownership
- Owner: Marion R. Williams
- Sister stations: WNIL

History
- First air date: 1991
- Call sign meaning: Smokin'

Technical information
- Licensing authority: FCC
- Facility ID: 40167
- Class: A
- ERP: 6,000 watts
- HAAT: 96.4 meters (316 ft)

Links
- Public license information: Public file; LMS
- Webcast: Listen live
- Website: www.wsmkradio.com

WSMK (99.1 MHz, "Smokin' 99.1") is a commercial FM radio station licensed to Buchanan, Michigan, and serving the South Bend metropolitan area. It is owned by Marion R. Williams and broadcasts a rhythmic contemporary radio format. WSMK covers the Michiana area of Michigan and Indiana, including South Bend, Elkhart, Benton Harbor and Michigan City.

The station has an effective radiated power of 6,000 watts. The studios, offices and transmitter are off South Philip Road in Niles, Michigan.

== History ==
WSMK signed on the air in 1991. It was an urban contemporary station known as "Smokin 99.1". This was the second urban station in the Michiana area, the first having been the former WLLJ (910 AM) in Cassopolis, which later switched to oldies as WGTO.

On February 4, 2005, WYPW (95.7 FM), formerly adult contemporary WLRX, became "Power 95.7"; it was in direct competition with "Smokin 99" for urban and hip hop music listeners. (WYPW is now Catholic radio WRDI.) In 2006, WSMK decided to tweak its format to a rhythmic adult contemporary approach and became "Movin' 99.1, Michiana's Greatest Hits", with the format delivered via satellite from Waitt Radio Networks.

In October 2010, with WYPW changing to classic rock as WAOR, 99.1 WSMK transitioned back to locally originating programming and brought back the "Smokin' 99.1" slogan.
