= WSFQ =

- Peshtigo, Wisconsin; United States
- Broadcast area: Marinette-Menominee
- Frequency: 96.3 MHz
- Branding: The Rock 96.3 WSFQ

Programming
- Format: Classic rock

Ownership
- Owner: Radio Plus Bay Cities, LLC
- Sister stations: WAGN, WHYB, WLST, WMAM

History
- First air date: 1989 (as WHYB)
- Former call signs: WHYB (1989–1992); WJMR (1992–1996)

Technical information
- Licensing authority: FCC
- Facility ID: 30467
- Class: C2
- ERP: 49,000 watts
- HAAT: 147 metres (482 ft)
- Transmitter coordinates: 45°7′19.00″N 87°51′7.00″W

Links
- Public license information: Public file; LMS
- Webcast: Listen Live

WSFQ (96.3 FM, "The Rock 96.3 WSFQ") is a radio station broadcasting a classic rock music format. Licensed to Peshtigo, Wisconsin, United States, the station is currently owned by Radio Plus Bay Cities, LLC.

== History ==
The station was assigned the call letters WHYB on October 31, 1989. On July 15, 1992, the station changed its call sign to WJMR and then on June 7, 1996, to the current WSFQ.

In January 2009, WSFQ changed from classic rock as "Rock 96" to a "best of the '70s and '80s" format as "Hits 96.3." Prior to the classic rock format, WSFQ had played oldies under the "Q96" moniker. The station later evolved into an adult contemporary format by adding more current and recent hits into rotation.

On January 2, 2020, WSFQ changed their format back to classic rock, branded as "The Rock 96.3 WSFQ".
