= WLST =

Coordinates: 45.063°N 87.657°W

- Marinette, Wisconsin; United States
- Frequency: 95.1 MHz
- Branding: Cat Country 95.1

Programming
- Format: Country
- Affiliations: Packers Radio Network

Ownership
- Owner: Radio Plus Bay Cities, LLC
- Sister stations: WAGN, WHYB, WMAM, WSFQ

History
- Former call signs: WLOT-FM

Technical information
- Licensing authority: FCC
- Facility ID: 47935
- Class: C1
- ERP: 100,000 watts
- HAAT: 133 meters

Links
- Public license information: Public file; LMS
- Webcast: Listen Live
- Website: WLST Online

WLST (95.1 FM) is an American commercial radio station licensed to Marinette, Wisconsin broadcasting a country music format.

95.1 FM had been an adult contemporary format (as "The Wave", previously known by the monikers "Live 95" and "Easy Rock 95") station until January, 2008 when then-owner Armada Media swapped formats between WLST and WHYB in Menominee, Michigan. WHYB became "The Wave" while the higher powered WLST took on the "Cat Country" name and format.

Original call letters were WLOT-FM. WLOT was located at 1300 kHz and later became WCJL before going silent in the late 1980s.
