= WBMI =

Coordinates: 44.299°N 84.265°W

- West Branch, Michigan; United States
- Broadcast area
- Frequency: 105.5 MHz
- Branding: Smile FM: Michigan's Positive Hits

Programming
- Format: Contemporary Christian
- Affiliations: Michigan Radio Network

Ownership
- Owner: Superior Communications

History
- Call sign meaning: West Branch Michigan

Technical information
- Licensing authority: FCC
- Facility ID: 29288
- Class: A
- ERP: 6,000 watts
- HAAT: 91 meters (299 ft)

Links
- Public license information: Public file; LMS

WBMI is an American radio station, licensed to West Branch, Michigan, the seat of government for Ogemaw County. The station broadcasts at the assigned frequency of 105.5 MHz with an erp of 6,000 watts. The station plays Contemporary Christian music and is owned by Superior Communications, which owns the Smile FM network of radio stations.

== History ==
The call letters WBMI first were used by a station in Meriden, Connecticut. That station has been WKSS since 1977 and has had a Top-40 format since 1984.

=== Early history as WBMB ===
WBMI of West Branch, Michigan was the FM sister station of WBMB-AM, which first signed on the air June 7, 1972 at 1060 kHz with 1,000 watts output power, from transmitter facilities at 1245 Gray Road in West Branch. The construction permit for WBMB was first granted January 12, 1968, but encountered a delay due to a competing application from another party in August of that same year. Construction resumed in July 1971, after Ogemaw Broadcasting Company ultimately prevailed in legal proceedings.

The station was owned by Ogemaw Broadcasting Company, with studios located at 206 W. Houghton Avenue in West Branch. Gene Kauffman, an Escanaba resident, was the president and general manager. The station was owned by Jack E. (Gene) Kauffman, Dean W. Manley and Robert Marshall. Manley was the chief engineer who designed and built the station, Marshall was owner and publisher of the Ogemaw County Herald. Kauffman and Manley were each 25% owners and Marshall 50%.

=== WBMI signs on ===
WBMB was a daytime-only AM station for its entire existence. In 1977, Ogemaw Broadcasting Company was granted a construction permit to put WBMI on the air. Studios and offices were then moved down the street to 714 W. Houghton Avenue. WBMI signed on the air in 1980.

WBMB and WBMI were a typical small-market radio station of their time, with few employees working shared duties. World and national news was provided by Westwood One, with a mass appeal format of adult contemporary and oldies music on WBMB, and WBMI leaning more of a Top 40 sound. The two stations for a time, simulcast programming as WBMB was not able to provide listeners with local radio service at night.

=== Sale and Decline ===
The stations were sold to David Swittek, a TV engineer from Bay City, Michigan on a terms contract. He defaulted on the contract a few years later. And on November 20, 1985, both stations were sold to Ashuelot Broadcasting, a company headed by Gene Flowers, who once served as general manager under Ogemaw Broadcasting's ownership. By this time, both stations simulcast each other 100 percent and switched to an adult contemporary format.

Former owners Jack E. Kauffman and Robert S. Marshall regained control after the succeeding owner declared bankruptcy on November 1, 1989, with Michael Baker assuming the role of president and general manager. The stations then went dark in 1991.

=== Rebirth ===
In the summer of 1993, WBMI returned to the air as "Kool FM 105.5" with the format provided via satellite by Jones Radio Network after being sold to Ives Broadcasting of Alpena, which also owned adult contemporary-CHR formatted WHSB (Bay 108). Ives' intent was to cross-market several stations calling them the "Northern Radio Network". On-air functions originated from WHSB's studio location in Alpena, with no local presence in West Branch other than the transmitting antenna.

WBMB did not return to the air with WBMI, and under the Telecommunications Act of 1996, still having not returned to the air, its license was permanently canceled. In March 1999, the license for WBMI was transferred from Ives Broadcasting to Northern Radio Network, with no changes in ownership.

The Northern Radio Network effort ended in October 2000, with WBMI going silent once again. The following year, WBMI was sold to Independent TV Productions. Independent TV Productions resumed WBMI's operations with Jones Radio Network's Hot AC format. During this time, the station imaged itself with various monikers, such as "Kool Mix 105.5" and "Channel 105.5." A few years later WBMI returned to oldies and then changed to classic country, all also satellite-fed from Jones.

In July 2005, industry sources reported that husband and wife Kevin and Alana Beamish, of Owosso, Michigan agreed to purchase the station for $300,000.

In August 2005, a filing was submitted to transfer the license to a minority shareholder (Peggy Warner) on the basis that she had loaned money to the company. The transfer application included an agreement written by Mrs Warner purporting to transfer the license and related assets to herself. The FCC dismissed the application. Three days later, the application to transfer control of the license to the Beamishes was submitted and approved by the FCC, but the transfer was never consummated and the license stayed in the name of Independent TV Productions.

In April 2008, the license was successfully transferred to Peggy Warner. Management duties were assumed by longtime northern Michigan radio personality Charlie Cobb, a longtime fixture at WKKM.

In August 2011, Cobb and Michael Fleming, entered into an agreement to purchase WBMI from Warner under the name CF Broadcasting, for $360,000. The FCC approved the sale on October 6, 2011.

=== Legal issues ===
In August 2019 CF Broadcasting attempted to transfer ownership of WBMI to a separate company also owned by Cobb and Fleming. That resulted in a lawsuit from Peggy Warner accusing CF Broadcasting of non-payment. A court-appointed receiver then took the station silent on January 25, 2020. On August 6, 2020, an Ogemaw County judge returned ownership of the station to Ms. Warner in return for her dropping a claim against property owned by Mr. Fleming. The station returned to the air in late October 2020.

The station was sold to Superior Communications, owner of the Smile FM Contemporary Christian network of stations based in Williamston, Michigan in October 2023.

== Sources ==
- Michiguide.com - WBMI History
