= WKPR =

Coordinates: 42°18′47.1″N 85°37′3″W

Kalamazoo, Michigan; United States
- Frequency: 1440 kHz
- Branding: The Good News Station

Programming
- Format: Religious radio
- Affiliations: WFUR

Ownership
- Owner: Kuiper Stations; (Kalamazoo Broadcasting Co., Inc.)

History
- First air date: 1960
- Last air date: 2022
- Former frequencies: 1420 kHz (1961–2011)
- Call sign meaning: William Kuiper

Technical information
- Licensing authority: FCC
- Facility ID: 33280
- Class: D
- Power: 4,000 watts day; 24 watts night

Links
- Public license information: Public file; LMS

WKPR (1440 AM) was a radio station that served Kalamazoo, Michigan, area of the United States. The station, which operated from 1960 to 2022, was owned by Kuiper Stations, via licensee Kalamazoo Broadcasting Co., Inc.

== History ==
WKPR began its broadcast life in 1960. An unusual result of the Federal Communications Commission (FCC) hearing ahead of its creation was that two radio station licenses were granted at the same time: WKPR (1420 kHz) in Kalamazoo, and WDOW (1440 kHz), a new service to Dowagiac. Both stations were constructed in 1960, and remained affiliates for many years. WKPR programming was a mix of Christian music and Bible teaching. WDOW programming was similar but did have secular music segments at some times of the day.

In the late 1990s, WDOW and WDOW-FM were sold, and by 2012, WDOW and WDOW-FM had different owners. At the same time, WKPR had been looking for a way to increase in power, which was not feasible at 1420 kHz. However, a substantial power increase would work at 1440 kHz. The engineers found that the former affiliate WDOW would need to be moved to Kalamazoo. Overtures were made to the owner of WDOW, and a sale agreement was made. Upon FCC approval, WKPR relinquished 1420 kHz and began broadcasting on 1440 kHz at the Kalamazoo location. Early in 2012, power went from 1,000 watts to 2,700 watts. Late in 2012, WKPR extended its programming further through the purchase and construction of an FM translator. The system was engineered so that the translator could be located at the WKPR site. The FM translator (W286AU) located at 105.1 FM simulcasted 24 hours a day with WKPR. WKPR was always a sister station to WFUR in Grand Rapids.

As of late July 2022, the 105.1 FM simulcast was broken; the translator switched to WAKV, a country music station called "Jethro FM". As of early August 2022, WKPR was reported as being silent. The license was surrendered to the FCC and canceled on January 10, 2023.
