= WJQK =

Coordinates: 42.816°N 85.957°W

- Zeeland, Michigan; United States
- Broadcast area: Holland, Michigan; Muskegon, Michigan; Grand Haven, Michigan; Grand Rapids, Michigan
- Frequency: 99.3 MHz
- Branding: Joy 99.3

Programming
- Format: Christian adult contemporary

Ownership
- Owner: Lanser Broadcasting
- Sister stations: WPNW

History
- First air date: 1971 (as WZND-FM)
- Former call signs: WZND-FM (1971–1987)

Technical information
- Licensing authority: FCC
- Facility ID: 4364
- Class: A
- ERP: 4,700 watts
- HAAT: 113 meters (371 ft)

Links
- Public license information: Public file; LMS
- Webcast: Listen live
- Website: www.joy99.com

WJQK (99.3 FM) is a commercial radio station licensed to Zeeland, Michigan and serving the western portion of the Grand Rapids metropolitan area. The station broadcasts a Christian adult contemporary radio format and is owned by Lanser Broadcasting. It calls itself "Joy 99.3". The studios and offices are on 143rd Avenue in Holland. The station is a sponsor of the annual Unity Christian Music Festival in Muskegon. Lanser Broadcasting also owns WPNW.

WJQK has an effective radiated power (ERP) of 4,700 watts. The transmitter is on 72nd Avenue in Zeeland, near Interstate 196. Despite its modest power, it provides at least secondary coverage to much of the core of West Michigan. It has recently begun identifying as a full-market station, identifying as "Zeeland-Grand Rapids."

Unlike most Christian radio outlets, WJQK operates as a commercial station. Station management wanted to rely on advertising support from local businesses in order to free listeners to support nonprofits in West Michigan.

== History ==
=== WZND ===
Originally a country music station, the station signed on the air in 1971. Its original call sign was WZND-FM (which referred to city of license Zeeland, Michigan), until Lanser Broadcasting purchased the station and changed them to WJQK in January 1987. The studios were moved into the same building in Holland, Michigan, as sister station WWJQ (now WPNW) but the transmitting tower remained in Zeeland along Interstate 196 near the 96th Avenue overpass until the early 1990s when it was moved three miles east to where 72nd Avenue would cross the highway.

During the 1980s and 1990s, the station (and its AM sister) promoted themselves as WJQ.

=== JQ99 ===
In 1997, the logo and nickname were changed to reflect the new moniker "JQ 99". A new Christian Hot AC/CHR format was introduced as well.

2005 saw the tagline of "Today's Best Christian Music" replaced by "Positive Hits" as well as the move of the business office and studio from Holland to Zeeland.

=== Relaunch as JQ99.3 ===
At midnight on April 8, 2013, JQ99 relaunched as JQ99.3 after a full hour of stunting with old JQ99 jingles and liners. After that, the station started the launch by airing a 2.5 minute liner all about the old station, and telling listeners about the new rebrand, after which the new Toth was fired up, and the first song, Let My Words Be Few by Phillips, Craig and Dean. The last song played under the JQ brand was Blessed by Rachael Lampa. The new rebrand now plays music from 2000–present.

The new slogan is Energetic Positive Music, replacing Connected and growing from their previous JQ99 name. On May 1, 2013 the slogan was changed from Energetic Positive Music to Your Faith, Your Music.

JQ99.3 was a reporter to Mediabase 24/7's Christian Adult Contemporary panel, until August 15, 2016.

=== 99-3 JQK ===
At midnight on August 15, 2016 WJQK changed to Christian CHR as 99-3 JQK, GR's Positive Hits And Hip Hop, With the first song being Britt Nicole's "Ready or Not" featuring Lecrae. This is JQ's second attempt at Christian CHR, and the second time using Saint John as the imaging voice though he would be replaced with Josh Ashton and a new female voice by January 2017. The station also uses the B96 jingle package produced by Reelworld.

=== Back to JQ99.3 ===
On January 1, 2018, with Chad Ericason as the new imaging voice, the new sound of JQ99.3 was launched. The station is once again a Christian CHR/Hot AC hybrid format just like 1997, with songs from 1990 until now, although the station is more current based rather than recurrents being heavily played. JQ99.3 is now a reporter to the Christian Hot AC panel from Mediabase for the first time in its history.

=== Joy 99 ===
In late 2018, JQ 99.3 performed another rebranding, this time as "Joy 99.3". The rebrand included a new jingle package produced by RadioScape.

In 2020, the station added a new holiday jingle package to accompany its continuous Christmas music programming, also produced by RadioScape.

The station operated a satellite studio, known as JQ2, in Holland's Westshore Mall until 2008.
