= WPHN =

FM radio station in Gaylord, Michigan

Coordinates: 45°08′17″N 84°09′44″W

- Gaylord, Michigan; United States
- Broadcast area: Northern Michigan
- Frequency: 90.5 MHz
- Branding: The Promise FM

Programming
- Format: Christian Adult Contemporary Music; Christian Talk and Teaching

Ownership
- Owner: Northern Christian Radio, Inc.
- Sister stations: WOLW, WTHN

History
- First air date: April 7, 1985
- Call sign meaning: We Praise His Name

Technical information
- Licensing authority: FCC
- Facility ID: 49536
- Class: C
- ERP: 100,000 watts
- HAAT: 305 meters (1,001 ft)

Links
- Public license information: Public file; LMS
- Webcast: Listen Live
- Website: promisefm.com

WPHN (90.5 FM) is a radio station licensed to Gaylord, Michigan. WPHN airs a format consisting of Christian adult contemporary music with some Christian talk and teaching, and is the flagship station of The Promise FM. The station serves Northern Michigan and is owned by Northern Christian Radio, Inc.

Previous logo

== Translators ==
WPHN is also heard in Newberry, Michigan through a translator on 88.7 FM, and in the Petoskey, Michigan area through a translator on 99.7 FM.

Call sign	Frequency	City of license	FID	ERP (W)	Class	FCC info
W204AQ	88.7 FM	Newberry, Michigan	37810	11	D	LMS
W259AH	99.7 FM	Petoskey, Michigan	88079	10	D	LMS
