= WNFR =

Coordinates: 43.174°N 82.600°W

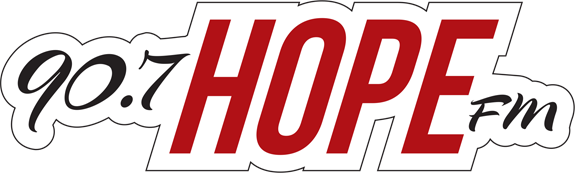
- Sandusky, Michigan; United States
- Broadcast area
- Frequency: 90.7 MHz
- Branding: 90.7 Hope FM (effective 01/13/14)

Programming
- Format: Religious; Christian soft AC and talk

Ownership
- Owner: Ross Bible Church
- Sister stations: WNFA, WNFH

History
- First air date: 1994
- Call sign meaning: Wonderful News Radio

Technical information
- Licensing authority: FCC
- Facility ID: 57704
- Class: B
- ERP: 42,000 watts
- HAAT: 150 meters (490 ft)
- Repeater: WNFH

Links
- Public license information: Public file; LMS
- Website: https://www.myhopefm.net/

WNFR, broadcasting at 90.7 FM, is a Contemporary Christian music and talk radio station licensed to Sandusky, Michigan. It also maintains a full time repeater signal out in Vassar, WNFH, on 98.9 FM, boosting the signal of WNFR 90.7 into more populated areas; this additional signal was acquired in 2024.

== Location ==
WNFR has a studio located in Port Huron along with sister station WNFA, and a 42,000 watt directional transmitter at Jeddo, near the Sanilac/St. Clair county line. WNFR is repeated on WNFH 98.9 in Vassar.

== Rebranding ==
WNFR rebranded from "Wonderful News Radio" to "90.7 Hope FM" on January 13, 2014.

In 2024, the 90.7 was removed from their branding after the addition of simulcast partner WNFH in Vassar.
