= WOBE =

Coordinates: 45.821°N 88.043°W

- Crystal Falls, Michigan; United States
- Broadcast area: Iron Mountain and the Central Upper Peninsula of Michigan
- Frequency: 100.7 MHz
- Branding: 100.7 Radio Now

Programming
- Format: Top 40/CHR

Ownership
- Owner: Results Broadcasting of Iron Mountain
- Sister stations: WHTO, WJNR

History
- First air date: 1999
- Former call signs: WAQJ (11/22/96-7/13/98)

Technical information
- Licensing authority: FCC
- Facility ID: 15015
- Class: C1
- ERP: 100,000 watts
- HAAT: 199 meters (653 ft)

Links
- Public license information: Public file; LMS
- Webcast: Listen live
- Website: www.906daily.com/radio-now/

WOBE (100.7 FM, "100.7 Radio Now") is a radio station broadcasting a top 40/CHR format. Licensed to Crystal Falls, Michigan, with studios in Iron Mountain, it first began broadcasting in 1999, carrying the Oldies Radio package from ABC Radio Networks.

== History ==
On June 14, 2012 WOBE changed their format from classic hits (as B-100.7) to Top 40/contemporary hit radio, branded as "100.7 Radio Now".

== Sources ==
- Michiguide.com - WOBE History
