= WPNW =

Coordinates: 42°43′56″N 86°06′06″W

- Zeeland, Michigan; United States
- Broadcast area: Grand Rapids metropolitan area
- Frequency: 1260 kHz
- Branding: Joy Worship 96.5/98.9

Programming
- Format: Contemporary worship music

Ownership
- Owner: Lanser Broadcasting
- Sister stations: WJQK

History
- First air date: 1956 (as WJBL)
- Former call signs: WJBL (1956–1982); WWJQ (1982–2003)
- Call sign meaning: "Praise and worship"

Technical information
- Licensing authority: FCC
- Facility ID: 36532
- Class: B
- Power: 10,000 watts day; 1,000 watts night
- Translators: 96.5 W243BD (Zeeland); 98.9 W255DI (Zeeland)

Links
- Public license information: Public file; LMS
- Webcast: Listen live
- Website: joyworship.today

WPNW (1260 AM) is a contemporary worship music radio station in Zeeland, Michigan, in the United States. The station is owned by Lanser Broadcasting, which also owns WJQK.

Signing on the air on November 2, 1956, it originally had the call letters WJBL (standing for the initials of owner-partners John, Bud and Len). Sister station WJBL-FM had a frequency of 94.5 MHz (currently WKLQ).

WJBL became WWJQ in January 1982 when purchased by Lanser Broadcasting. In the mid-1980s, WWJQ was a beautiful music station. When it was paired with FM sister station WJQK, it was known as WJQ AM and FM. In January 2003, WWJQ became WPNW ("praise and worship").

As of September 1, 2005, WPNW flipped to news/talk, after several years as a praise and worship station. It was positioned as "1260 The Pledge".

On August 31, 2020, WPNW changed formats from religious talk to worship music, branded as "Joy Worship 96.5/98.9".

WPNW programming is simulcast on FM translators 96.5 W243BD and 98.9 W255DI, also licensed to Zeeland.

== Sources ==
- Michiguide.com - WPNW History
