= WMMI =

- Shepherd, Michigan; United States
- Broadcast area: Mount Pleasant, Michigan (Daytime)
- Frequency: 830 kHz
- Branding: Buck 92

Programming
- Format: Classic country

Ownership
- Owner: Robert and Laurie Peters; (Latitude Media, LLC)
- Sister stations: WCZY-FM

History
- First air date: February 2, 1987
- Call sign meaning: We're Mid-Michigan Info (former branding)

Technical information
- Licensing authority: FCC
- Facility ID: 9915
- Class: D
- Power: 1,000 watts day
- Transmitter coordinates: 43°33′42″N 83°45′00″W
- Translator: 92.3 W222CP (Shepherd)

Links
- Public license information: Public file; LMS
- Webcast: Listen Live
- Website: buck92.com

WMMI (830 AM) is a radio station located in Shepherd, Michigan. It airs a classic country format branded as "Buck 92.3".

== History ==
=== Beginnings ===
The groundwork for WMMI was first laid in the late 1970s when G.R.G. Associates (Lowell J. Gates, Wayne S. Reese and Toby R. Gates) sought a construction permit for a new AM station to be licensed to Marshall, Michigan on 680 khz. This application was successfully objected to by NBC, then owners of WMAQ (AM) in Chicago, which operated on adjacent frequency 670 khz.

In July of 1992, G.R.G. Associates filed another application at Marshall, this time specifying the frequency 830 khz. This application was apparently granted by December of 1983 when G.R.G. Associates were assigned the WMMI call letters by the FCC.

Great Lakes Radio Corp., a company headed by Gary Randall, acquired the permit for WMMI in February of 1985. The new licensee then filed an application in March, 1985 to move to unbuilt station to Shepherd, Michigan, approximately 87 miles north of Marshall. This request was granted in July of 1986, after settlement of a conflicting application of Christian Media, Inc. for a new station on the adjacent frequency 840 khz in nearby Hemlock, Michigan.

Prior to purchasing WMMI, Great Lakes Radio Corp. previously filed an application for new AM station in Mt. Pleasant in February of 1984. However, there is no evidence that this application was ever granted.

WMMI, now licensed to Shepherd, was granted its formal license (license to cover) on February 10, 1987. Studios, offices and transmitter facilities were located at 4865 East Wing Road in Mount Pleasant. The station first went on the air as an affiliate of the Satellite Music Network, using its "Pure Gold" classic hits format, for music and disc jockeys, with some local announcers producing news and sports and commercials on site. The station also broadcast in stereo during these early years.

=== WCZY Signs On ===
In August 1988, Central Michigan Communications, a company headed by Mike Carey, purchased WMMI, pairing it with a construction permit they had acquired to build an FM station. That station, known as WCZY, went on the air on August 20, 1991.

=== Sale to Latitude Media ===
After more than 25 years of ownership, Central Michigan Communications in 2013 sold WMMI and WCZY to its current owner, Latitude Media, for $779,000.

=== Buck 92 ===
On January 4, 2021, WMMI changed their format from talk to classic country, branded as "Buck 92".

== Programming ==
WMMI previously specialized primarily in political and news programming, airing many of the biggest names in AM talk such as Rush Limbaugh, Herman Cain and more.

In addition, WMMI previously offered Michigan-focused news and talk every weekday with Michigan's Morning Show with Michael Patrick Shiels from 6A-9A.

On the weekends, WMMI airs an assortment of special-topic programs on a variety of interests, from cars to baseball to technology.

The station broadcasts during daytime hours only, to protect Class-A clear-channel station WCCO in Minneapolis at night.
