= WRCI =

Coordinates: 41°55′43″N 85°38′15″W

- Three Rivers, Michigan; United States
- Frequency: 1520 kHz
- Branding: River Country 97.1

Programming
- Format: Classic Country
- Affiliations: Michigan Radio Network

Ownership
- Owner: Impact Radio
- Sister stations: WLKM-FM

History
- First air date: April 1962 (as WLKM at 1510)
- Former call signs: WLKM (04/62-09/18/08)
- Former frequencies: 1510 kHz (1962–2003)
- Call sign meaning: W River Country I

Technical information
- Licensing authority: FCC
- Facility ID: 70462
- Class: D
- Power: 430 watts (Daytime); 8 watts (Nighttime)
- Translators: 97.1 W246BW (Three Rivers) (106.9 MHz) W295DA (Sturgis)

Links
- Public license information: Public file; LMS
- Website: wrciradio.com

WRCI is a radio station owned by Impact Radio and licensed to Three Rivers, Michigan. It airs Westwood One's Classic Country format under the moniker River Country 97.1.

WRCI was known as WLKM until September 18, 2008. WRCI programming is simulcast on a translator (W246BW) at 97.1 FM in Three Rivers, hence the station's moniker of "River Country 97.1." Prior to the current Classic Hit Country, WLKM operated at 1510 on the AM dial as a Music of Your Life station.
