= WMLM =

Coordinates: 43°21′8.1″N 84°36′20″W

St. Louis, Michigan; United States
- Frequency: 1520 kHz
- Branding: Real Country, The Big M

Programming
- Format: Country
- Affiliations: Real Country (Westwood One); Michigan Farm Radio Network; Motor Racing Network

Ownership
- Owner: Krol Communications Inc.
- Sister stations: WJSZ

History
- First air date: 1977
- Last air date: December 31, 2024
- Call sign meaning: Middle of Lower Michigan

Technical information
- Licensing authority: FCC
- Facility ID: 60293
- Class: B
- Power: 1,000 watts unlimited
- Translator(s): 105.9 W290DR (St. Louis)

Links
- Public license information: Public file; LMS
- Website: web.shiawasseechamber.org/Radio/Krol-Communications-Inc-Z925-The-Castle-386

WMLM (1520 AM) was a radio station located in St. Louis, Michigan, broadcasting Westwood One's satellite-delivered Real Country format, a hybrid of classic and current country hits. WMLM mainly had broadcast to the north along the US-127 corridor, and was one of four radio stations to broadcast from Gratiot County.

AM 1520 is a United States clear-channel frequency; WWKB in Buffalo, New York, and KOKC in Oklahoma City, Oklahoma, share Class A status on this frequency.

== History ==
WMLM began broadcasting in 1977 as a daytime-only station and added nighttime operations in 1982. The station originally broadcast from downtown St. Louis on 1540 kHz, moving south of the city in 1983 to a location on State Road. The station switched to 1520 AM and added six 200-foot (61 m) transmission towers. In addition to its country-music format, WMLM provided farm and agricultural news updates as an affiliate of the Michigan Farm Radio Network, with which the station was affiliated early on.

Original owner Greg Siefker sold WMLM to Krol Communications, owners of WJSZ in Ashley, Michigan, in May 2008 after the Federal Communications Commission (FCC) gave approval in March. Speaking to the Mount Pleasant Morning Sun, Siefker cited exhaustion and recent health issues as a reason for selling his station, although he was to stay on as a consultant. WMLM had no change in its format following the sale.

Krol Communications closed WMLM on December 31, 2024. The FCC cancelled the station’s license on January 27, 2025.

== Programming ==
WMLM's featured the only "live and local" morning show in Gratiot County, "One Track Mind", providing Mid-Michigan with local news, sports, weather, and obituaries. The host was Timothy Mitchell. Former hosts included Dan Manley, Justin Orminski, Tyler Scott, Tallon Weatherby, Isaac McCormack, and Josh Lattime.

The station broadcast high school sports for local high school Breckinridge, St Louis, and Ithaca. WMLM was also the local affiliate for the NASCAR Cup Series.
