= WJNR-FM =

Coordinates: 45.821°N 88.043°W

- Iron Mountain, Michigan; United States
- Broadcast area
- Frequency: 101.5 MHz
- Branding: Frog 101.5

Programming
- Format: Country
- Affiliations: ABC News Radio; Packers Radio Network

Ownership
- Owner: Results Broadcasting
- Sister stations: WHTO, WOBE

History
- First air date: 1972

Technical information
- Licensing authority: FCC
- Facility ID: 72151
- Class: C1
- ERP: 100,000 watts
- HAAT: 187 meters (614 ft)

Links
- Public license information: Public file; LMS
- Webcast: Listen live
- Website: www.906daily.com/frog-country/

WJNR-FM (101.5 MHz) is a radio station broadcasting a country music format. Licensed to Iron Mountain, Michigan; it began broadcasting in 1972.

== Sources ==
- Michiguide.com - WJNR-FM history
