= WTHN =

Radio station in Michigan, US

- Sault Ste. Marie, Michigan; United States
- Broadcast area: Sault Ste. Marie, Michigan; Sault Ste. Marie, Ontario
- Frequency: 102.3 MHz
- Branding: The Promise FM

Programming
- Format: Christian Contemporary Music; Christian talk and teaching

Ownership
- Owner: Northern Christian Radio, Inc.
- Sister stations: WPHN, WOLW

History
- First air date: 2005
- Call sign meaning: Similar to sister station WPHN

Technical information
- Licensing authority: FCC
- Facility ID: 91115
- Class: C3
- ERP: 22,500 watts
- HAAT: 105 meters
- Transmitter coordinates: 46°29′08″N 84°13′49″W

Links
- Public license information: Public file; LMS
- Webcast: Listen Live
- Website: thepromisefm.com

WTHN (102.3 FM) is a radio station licensed to Sault Ste. Marie, Michigan. WTHN airs a format consisting of Christian contemporary music and Christian talk and teaching as an affiliate of The Promise FM, and is owned by Northern Christian Radio, Inc.

Previous logo
