= WNFH =

Radio station in Vassar, Michigan

Coordinates: 43.299°N 83.509°W

Simulcasts WNFR
- Vassar, Michigan; United States
- Broadcast area: Flint, Saginaw, Bay City, Michigan
- Frequency: 98.9 MHz
- Branding: Hope FM

Programming
- Format: Christian contemporary

Ownership
- Owner: Ross Bible Church
- Sister stations: WNFA, WNFR

History
- First air date: July 1, 1990
- Former call signs: WOWE (1990-2023)
- Call sign meaning: Similar to WNFR

Technical information
- Licensing authority: FCC
- Facility ID: 53297
- Class: A
- ERP: 3,000 watts
- HAAT: 100 meters (330 ft)

Links
- Public license information: Public file; LMS
- Website: https://www.myhopefm.net/

WNFH (98.9 FM), is a radio station licensed to Vassar, Michigan. The station features a Christian Contemporary music format targeting the Flint and Saginaw markets, and is a full time simulcast of sister station WNFR 90.7 FM. Its transmitter is in Millington, Michigan.

== History ==
=== As WOWE ===
WOWE began as a mostly satellite-fed station, airing the syndicated urban-adult "Touch" format from ABC Radio Networks. In 1999, with the growing popularity of the Rhythmic Oldies format nationwide, WOWE switched to Westwood One's "Groovin' Oldies" format. WOWE stayed with the Rhythmic Oldies format for a time after the "Groovin' Oldies" format was discontinued, but has since evolved back to Urban AC.

On May 17, 2021, WOWE flipped to hip hop, branded as "98.9 The Beat".

=== Silence, Sale, and a New Beginning ===
On December 31, 2023, WOWE went silent, filing a Silent STA. The station ultimately would not return to the air again using the WOWE calls.

On April 19, 2024, a notification of consummation was filed with the FCC, then on April 25, a call sign request was filed to change the call sign to WNFH. The original WOWE calls have been recycled within the Smile FM network, on a newer station of theirs in Delano, Tennessee.

On June 28, 2024, 98.9 FM- now identifying as WNFH- returned to the air under new calls and ownership, with a Christian Contemporary format from WNFR, multiplying the reach of Hope FM into much more populated areas, with secondary coverage into Flint, Saginaw, and Bay City, and areas inbetween.

== Sources ==
- Michiguide.com - WOWE History
