= WNFA =

Coordinates: 42.993°N 82.468°W

- Port Huron, Michigan; United States
- Broadcast area
- Frequency: 88.3 MHz
- Branding: Thrive Radio

Programming
- Format: Christian teaching/Worship

Ownership
- Owner: Ross Bible Church
- Sister stations: WNFR, WNFH

History
- First air date: May 15, 1986
- Former call signs: WZJI (1/2/85-11/9/85)
- Call sign meaning: Wonderful News For All

Technical information
- Licensing authority: FCC
- Facility ID: 57705
- Class: A
- ERP: 1,300 watts
- HAAT: 61 meters

Links
- Public license information: Public file; LMS
- Webcast: Listen Live
- Website: mythriveradio.net

WNFA (88.3 FM) is a Christian teaching/worship radio station in Port Huron, Michigan, United States, branded as "Bluewater Christian Hit Radio". WNFA broadcasts with 1,300 watts.

WNFA formerly featured programming from the WAY-FM Network (formerly the Christian Hit Radio Satellite Network) until national distribution of WAY-FM programming (except for "The Wally Show" mornings) to non-owned stations ceased on July 1, 2013. After a weekend of stunting with construction sounds, a revamped Power 88.3 debuted with a new local lineup. The Wally Show continues to air in morning drive.

WNFA is also the former flagship station of the Christian teaching and inspirational music format "Wonderful News Radio," which for a time aired solely on sister station WNFR 90.7 FM.

On June 22, 2022, at 9 a.m., WNFA changed their format from contemporary Christian to Christian teaching and worship, branded as "Thrive Radio".

Later, after WNFR's addition of simulcast station 98.9 WNFH Vassar in 2024, all Christian teaching programs were dropped on 90.7 and now 98.9 in favor of 24/7 Christian Contemporary Music.
