= WNIL =

- Niles, Michigan; United States
- Broadcast area: Niles-Buchanan, Michigan
- Frequency: 1290 kHz

Programming
- Format: Adult contemporary gold

Ownership
- Owner: Marion R. Williams
- Sister stations: WSMK

History
- First air date: 1956
- Call sign meaning: Niles, Michigan

Technical information
- Licensing authority: FCC
- Facility ID: 48912
- Class: D
- Power: 500 watts daytime; 44 watts nighttime
- Translator: 107.5 W298CQ (Niles)

Links
- Public license information: Public file; LMS

WNIL is an AM radio station located in Niles, Michigan, and broadcasting to the Niles-Buchanan region airing a classic hits-based adult contemporary format. It broadcasts on AM frequency 1290 kHz and 107.5 MHz; it is under ownership of Marion R. Williams.

== History ==
WNIL began its broadcasting activities in 1956 under an unknown format but in 1964 it became notable when Tommy James & the Shondells recorded a regional hit "Hanky Panky" (the studio was located at Sycamore and 5th Street). The song did not become a national hit until it was re-recorded in 1966. In the 1990s, it dropped its music format in favor of sports programming. In 1999, the sports format was dropped in favor of oldies, supplied from Jones Radio Networks' Good Time Oldies satellite feed. In June 1999, the FCC approved a license transfer from its original owner Niles Broadcasting to (Pathfinder Communications) along with sister station WAOR (95.3 FM).

Less than a year later, WNIL changed affiliations to ABC Radio's "Memories/Unforgettable Favorites" (a soft rock/AC and oldies hybrid) and ran that feed even throughout the merger with "Stardust" and the name change to Timeless Classics/Timeless Favorites. When 2007 began, local newscasts and talk programs were discontinued, making it an all-music station. However, in March 2007, the Timeless radio format was dropped in favor of syndicated talk programming. In October 2010, the format was changed to Christian radio, branded as "The Mighty 1290 - Spirited Talk Radio", focusing on "Faith, and Family Values".

In the summer of 2012, WNIL, along with sister station WAOR (95.7 FM), switched once again to a sports format. Most programming came from Fox Sports Radio, except for the Jim Rome show from CBS Sports Radio. In April 2014 WNIL and WAOR switched affiliations to ESPN Radio. A month later, on May 19, Federated Media announced the sale of WNIL to Marion R. Williams, who already owned WSMK (99.1 FM) in Buchanan; this followed the sale of WAOR to St. Joseph Catholic Radio a week earlier. The deal was consummated on August 29, 2014, at a purchase price of $225,000. That same day, WNIL changed its format to news/talk, simulcasting WTRC-FM 95.3; on October 1, 2014, WNIL split from this simulcast and changed its format to a soft AC/oldies mix.

== Translator ==
Call sign	Frequency	City of license	FID	ERP (W)	Class	Transmitter coordinates	FCC info
W298CQ	107.5 FM	Niles, Michigan	201047	80	D	41°49′23.5″N 86°17′2.6″W	LMS
