= WUPK =

Coordinates: 46.514°N 87.483°W

- Marquette, Michigan; United States
- Broadcast area
- Frequency: 94.1 MHz
- Branding: 94.1 The Breeze

Programming
- Format: Soft AC

Ownership
- Owner: Adam Bernier and Terry P. Holzmann; (Marquette Radio, LLC)
- Sister stations: WNGE

History
- First air date: 1992
- Call sign meaning: WUPK: Upper Peninsula's K-Rock (previous branding)

Technical information
- Licensing authority: FCC
- Facility ID: 64025
- Class: A
- ERP: 4,400 watts
- HAAT: 116 meters

Links
- Public license information: Public file; LMS
- Webcast: Listen Live
- Website: marquetteradiogroup.com

WUPK (94.1 FM) is a radio station based in the Upper Peninsula of Michigan licensed to Marquette, Michigan. The stations broadcast a soft adult contemporary format brand as 94.1 The Breeze.

WUPK signed on as a simulcast of WIMK in the 1990s. By the 2000s, the station adopted the name "Classic Rock: The Bear", joining Northern Star's existing group of Northern Michigan stations with this branding. However, The Bear's programming was not part of that specific network of stations, and aired its own music rotation.

Following the stations' sale from Northern Star Broadcasting to Sovereign Communications in 2010, WUPK broke their simulcast and re-imaged as "94 Rock". Accordingly, the station adopted similar identities, logos, and playlists as Rock 101, Sovereign's existing active rock station in Sault Ste. Marie, Michigan at WSUE 101.3 FM. WUPK/WIMK DJ Nikki "At Night" Peterson currently provides pre-recorded station bumpers for WSUE's nighttime music rotation.

In July 2020, WUPK changed their format from active rock to soft adult contemporary, branded as "94.1 The Breeze". The same year, Marquette Radio, LLC acquired WUPK and sister station WNGE from Sovereign Communications.

== Previous logo ==
(WUPK's logo under "The Bear" branding)

== Sources ==
- Michiguide.com - WUPK History
