= WHTO =

Coordinates: 45.821°N 88.043°W

- Iron Mountain, Michigan; United States
- Broadcast area
- Frequency: 106.7 MHz
- Branding: 106.7 The Mountain

Programming
- Format: Classic hits
- Affiliations: Michigan Radio Network Milwaukee Brewers Radio Network

Ownership
- Owner: Results Broadcasting
- Sister stations: WJNR, WOBE

History
- First air date: August 2003

Technical information
- Licensing authority: FCC
- Facility ID: 78163
- Class: C3
- ERP: 6,100 watts
- HAAT: 206 meters (676 ft)

Links
- Public license information: Public file; LMS
- Webcast: Listen live
- Website: www.906daily.com/the-mountain/

WHTO (106.7 FM, "The Mountain") is a radio station broadcasting a classic hits format. Licensed to Iron Mountain, Michigan, it first began broadcasting in 2003. The station's programming is delivered via satellite from Westwood One's Kool Gold network.
