= WHYB =

Coordinates: 45.067°N 87.665°W

- Menominee, Michigan; United States
- Broadcast area: Marinette, WI-Menominee, MI
- Frequency: 103.7 MHz
- Branding: Classic Hits 103.7

Programming
- Format: Classic hits
- Affiliations: CBS Radio; Michigan Radio Network; Westwood One Local Classic Hits format

Ownership
- Owner: Radio Plus Bay Cities, LLC
- Sister stations: WAGN, WLST, WMAM, WSFQ

History
- First air date: 1984 (as WCJL-FM)
- Former call signs: WCJL-FM (1/16/84-7/21/92)

Technical information
- Licensing authority: FCC
- Facility ID: 11609
- Class: C3
- ERP: 7,000 watts
- HAAT: 91 meters

Links
- Public license information: Public file; LMS
- Webcast: Listen Live
- Website: WHYB Online

WHYB (103.7 FM) is a radio station licensed to Menominee, Michigan and serving the areas of Menominee, neighboring Marinette, Wisconsin, and the immediate border area of Upper Michigan and Northeast Wisconsin. The station is owned by Radio Plus Bay Cities, LLC and broadcasts a classic hits music format.

== History ==
The station launched in 1984 as WCJL-FM, broadcasting at 106.3 FM (the current frequency of Escanaba-based WGMV). Under the ownership of CJL broadcasting, WCJL-FM aired a CHR format branded as "Hits 106." CJL Broadcasting owners Jim Callow and Leon Felch can be credited with bringing live, on-air personalities to the Hits 106 airwaves, a new concept to Marinette-Menominee radio at that time. Air personalities included Kevin Lyons-Tarr, Trigg "The Ugly Man" Turner, Linda Engels, Jeff Quinn, Pamela J, and Kit Donaldson. By early 1987, WCJL-FM would move to the 103.9 FM frequency and rebrand as "Power 104."

In 1992, the station would adopt its current frequency and call sign and also adopt a country music format as "Cat Country 103.7." Country remained at 103.7 until the beginning of 2008, when new owners Armada Media swapped formats with sister station WLST, moving country to that station and relocating WLST's adult contemporary "Wave" format to 103.7. "The Wave" lasted on WHYB until late December 2008, when then-owner Armada Media moved the oldies format that aired on AM sister station WAGN to 103.7 (WAGN would adopt a full-time news-talk format).
