= WNGE =

Coordinates: 46.514°N 87.483°W

- Negaunee, Michigan; United States
- Broadcast area
- Frequency: 99.5 MHz
- Branding: 99.5 K-Rock

Programming
- Format: Active rock
- Affiliations: Michigan Radio Network

Ownership
- Owner: Adam Bernier and Terry P. Holzmann; (Marquette Radio, LLC)
- Sister stations: WUPK

History
- First air date: July 2001
- Call sign meaning: NeGauneE

Technical information
- Licensing authority: FCC
- Facility ID: 78159
- Class: A
- ERP: 3,600 watts
- HAAT: 131 meters (430 ft)

Links
- Public license information: Public file; LMS
- Webcast: Listen Live
- Website: marquetteradiogroup.com

WNGE (99.5 FM, "99.5 K-Rock") is a radio station licensed to Negaunee, Michigan, broadcasting an active rock format. The station first went on the air in July 2001. The station transmits its signal from an antenna with a height of 430 feet (130 m) with an effective radiated power of 3,600 watts located atop a hill in Marquette Township just west of the city of Marquette.

In July 2020, WNGE changed their format from classic hits to active rock, branded as "99.5 K-Rock". The format moved from sister station WUPK 94.1 FM, which switched to soft adult contemporary as "The Breeze."
