= WAAM =

- Ann Arbor, Michigan; United States
- Broadcast area: Washtenaw County, Michigan
- Frequency: 1600 kHz
- Branding: WAAM Radio

Programming
- Format: Talk radio
- Affiliations: Compass Media Networks; Fox News Radio; Genesis Communications Network; Premiere Networks; Salem Radio Network; Westwood One

Ownership
- Owner: Coolarity A2, LLC

History
- First air date: October 5, 1947
- Former call signs: WHRV (1948–1963)
- Call sign meaning: Ann Arbor, Michigan

Technical information
- Licensing authority: FCC
- Facility ID: 72276
- Class: B
- Power: 5,000 watts
- Transmitter coordinates: 42°11′32″N 83°41′9″W
- Translator: 92.7 W224ED (Ann Arbor)

Links
- Public license information: Public file; LMS
- Website: waamradio.com

WAAM (1600 kHz) is a commercial radio station in Ann Arbor, Michigan. It is owned by Coolarity A2, LLC, and broadcasts a talk radio format. The station's studios and offices are on Packard Road in Ann Arbor.

WAAM transmits with 5,000 watts with a directional antenna using a four-tower array. Its transmitter is on U.S. Route 23 in Ypsilanti, Michigan. Programming is also heard on 250-watt FM translator W224ED at 92.7 MHz in Ann Arbor.<

== Programming ==
Two local shows are heard each weekday. Steve Gruber hosts morning drive time and Thayrone X handles afternoons. The rest of the weekday schedule is nationally syndicated talk shows: Glenn Beck, Dennis Prager, Dana Loesch, Joe Pags, Alex Jones, Rich Valdes and America in the Morning. On weekends, specialty shows are heard, some of which are paid brokered programming. Most hours begin with an update from Fox News Radio.

== History ==
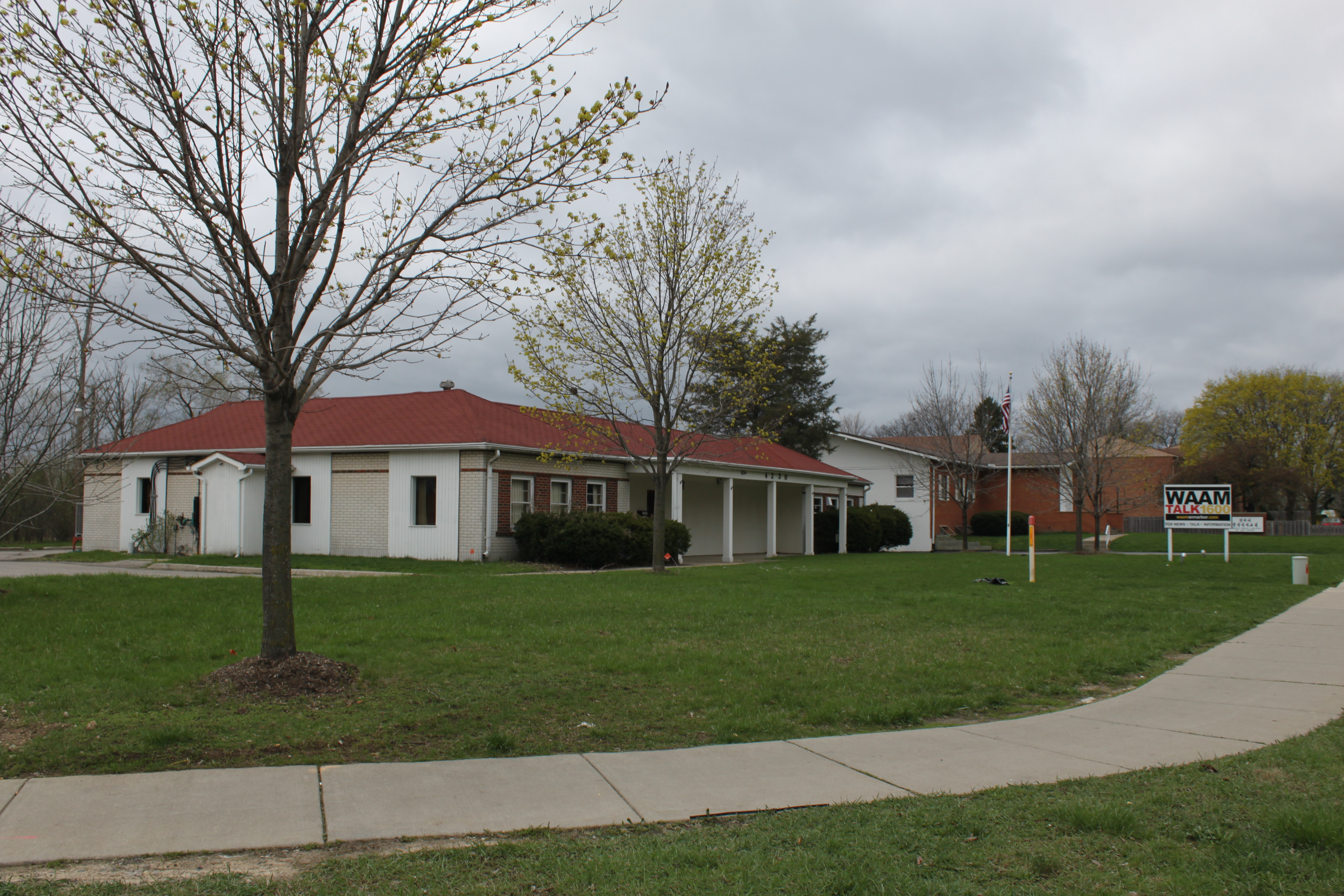
WAAM Studios, Packard Rd.

=== Early history: WHRV ===
The station signed on as WHRV on October 5, 1947, and originally served as the Ann Arbor market's ABC Radio affiliate, making it the second radio station in the area. WHRV was a typical full-service radio station of its day, with a wide variety of music ranging from pop vocals to rock and roll to Southern gospel, and a heavy commitment to local news and sports play-by-play. Ollie McLaughlin, a black DJ on WHRV, is credited for helping to discover early 1960s rocker and Michigan native Del Shannon, and, after he left the station in 1961, helped launch the careers of several other Michigan artists, including Barbara Lewis, The Capitols, and Deon Jackson.

=== WAAM in the 1960s ===
The station was sold in 1963 and that fall changed its call sign to WAAM. The now reorganized Michigan station's DJs on occasion pronounced the call sign like the word "Wham," and WAAM radio was affectionately known as "Wham" to many in the Ann Arbor community for years afterward, even after the station stopped using the "Wham" name on the air (the "Wham" pronunciation has recently been revived recently for the station's current talk format). Throughout the 1960s, WAAM featured chiefly middle of the road music during the day and played the new, increasingly popular "Top 40" rock n' roll music hits at night. WAAM was also one of the first AM radio stations to feature what came to be known as progressive rock, with a Sunday-night show called "Strobe" and later "Spectrum." WAAM developed a reputation for spotting potential hits before famous Canadian station CKLW in Windsor, Ontario and other Detroit-area competitors got a hold of them, including "Cherry, Cherry" by Neil Diamond and "Ramblin' Gamblin' Man" by Bob Seger.

The WAAM studios were almost completely destroyed by a fire in September 1968, forcing the station to broadcast from a trailer in its parking lot for over a year. The station moved into new studios in 1969 and at that time dropped all rock programming to become a full-time MOR ("middle-of-the-road") station. It took several years, however, for the station to fully recover from the fire, as it did not return to its full licensed power of 5,000 watts until early 1973, broadcasting with only 250 watts non-directional in the meantime.

=== Top 40 era (1972–76): Super WAAM ===
By early 1972, WAAM was being operated by a trust following the 1970 death of owner Frank Babcock (also a prominent voiceover artist), and the station's music had become more contemporary. Immediately upon the sale of the station in May 1972, WAAM began to transition to a full-time "Top 40" format, adding new jingles and shortening the length of newscasts. The transition was complete within a year. Known variously as "Super WAAM" (pronounced "Super Wham") and "Super 16", the station featured a high-energy presentation and a continued news and sports play-by-play commitment as well as Casey Kasem's increasingly popular "American Top 40" countdown show (added in 1975). Among WAAM's "Top 40" jocks were some who went on to greater success in the Detroit market, including Jim Harper (WDRQ, WNIC, WMGC-FM; known on WAAM as "Tom Michaels"), Don Riley (WDRQ; known on WAAM as "Jerry Riley"); Jim Michaels (on WDRQ, WWKR, WNIC, WTWR, WABX, WJOI, WYST, and as "The Electrifyin' Mojo" (on WGPR, WJLB, WHYT, and WMXD). (Other notable WHRV/WAAM station alumni, in addition to Ollie McLaughlin, include Ralph Binge, "Sleepyhead Ted" Johnson, Ted Heusel, and Greg Siefker, who later owned station WMLM in Alma, Michigan.)

=== The 1980s and 1990s: more changes ===
In 1976, WAAM was sold again and transitioned from ""Top 40" to a personality - oriented "Adult Contemporary" sound, eventually adding more call-in talk shows to its schedule. In 1982, the station affiliated with Satellite Music Network's (now known as Citadel Media / ABC Radio) carrying their. "Star Station" AC format.

Lloyd Johnson (d/b/a Whitehall Broadcasting) acquired the station in August 1983 and switched the station's music back to a more Middle of the Road presentation soon afterward. The format shift accompanied Ann Arbor radio legend's Ted Heusel moving to WAAM from 1050 WPAG (which had switched from standards to country music). Over the years, WAAM was affiliated with both Satellite Music Network/ABC Radio's "Timeless Favorites/Stardust" format and another radio network Westwood One's "America's Best Music/AM Only" format. Eventually WAAM transitioned to airing chiefly news and talk programming during the week with music programming (including the Westwood One "standards" format and specialty-interest syndicated shows such as "Broadway's Biggest Hits" and "The Sounds of Sinatra" with Sid Mark) available mostly on weekends. Some weekend music shows, specializing largely in "oldies" and other vintage rock- and blues-based music, remain on WAAM as of May 2015.

WAAM attempted to move to Oak Park, but that was dismissed. https://cdbs.recnet.com/corres/?doc=11457

=== Recent history ===
Logo before translator sign on

Whitehall Broadcasting sold WAAM to Big D Broadcasting in August 2003. WAAM was purchased by Coolarity A2, LLC. in May 2011. Thayrone's wife and business partner Linda Hughes was WAAM's General Manager at the time of her death in March 2018.

== See also ==
- Media in Detroit
