= WOLW =

Radio station in Cadillac, Michigan, US

Coordinates: 44°16′33″N 85°42′49″W

- Cadillac, Michigan; United States
- Broadcast area: Cadillac, Michigan; Manistee, Michigan
- Frequency: 91.1 MHz
- Branding: The Promise FM

Programming
- Format: Christian Contemporary Music; Christian Talk and Teaching

Ownership
- Owner: Northern Christian Radio, Inc.
- Sister stations: WPHN, WTHN

History
- First air date: 1988

Technical information
- Licensing authority: FCC
- Facility ID: 49537
- Class: C1
- ERP: 50,000 watts
- HAAT: 213 meters

Links
- Public license information: Public file; LMS
- Webcast: Listen Live
- Website: thepromisefm.com

WOLW (91.1 FM) is a radio station licensed to Cadillac, Michigan. WOLW airs a format consisting of Christian contemporary music and Christian talk and teaching as an affiliate of The Promise FM, and is owned by Northern Christian Radio, Inc.

Previous logo
