= WGTO =

- Cassopolis, Michigan; United States
- Broadcast area: Michiana
- Frequency: 910 kHz
- Branding: 97.1 The Ride

Programming
- Format: Gold Hot AC
- Affiliations: Michigan IMG Sports Network; Michigan News Network

Ownership
- Owner: Larry Langford; (Langford Broadcast)

History
- First air date: August 11, 1988
- Former call signs: WLLJ (1986–1995)
- Call sign meaning: "Good Time Oldies"

Technical information
- Licensing authority: FCC
- Facility ID: 36612
- Class: D
- Power: 1,000 watts (day); 35 watts (night)
- Transmitter coordinates: 41°57′14.17″N 86°0′59.03″W
- Translators: 96.7 W244EO (Dowagiac); 97.1 W246DV (South Bend, Indiana); 97.5 W248AP (Valparaiso, Indiana)

Links
- Public license information: Public file; LMS
- Webcast: Listen live
- Website: 971.fm

WGTO (910 AM, "97.1 The Ride") is a radio station broadcasting a gold hot AC format. It is licensed to Cassopolis, Michigan, United States, and is under ownership of Langford Broadcasting.

== History ==
WGTO was designed and built by longtime Chicago radio personality Larry Langford on August 11, 1988, as WLLJ and originally featured an urban contemporary format. It was the first black-owned station in Cassopolis. WGTO was the last station to be built under the AM daytime rules of the Federal Communications Commission. After the construction permit for this station was authorized in 1986 no further applications were accepted for stations wanting to operate daytime only. WGTO uses two towers in a directional pattern. The station now operates with 35 watts of nighttime power.

In 2007, Langford purchased a competing radio station in the same county and now became the owner of both WGTO and WDOW, which has since gone silent to allow a station in Kalamazoo to broadcast on its frequency.

On October 30, 2009, WGTO began broadcasting on 101.1 FM (translator W266BS licensed to Cassopolis, Michigan) as "Classic Hits 101". They continue to broadcast their AM signal as well. In June 2016, the FM translator moved to a new frequency of 96.3 MHz with call sign W242CN. The new translator broadcasts with an ERP of 250 watts, the maximum allowed for translators, and extends WGTO's FM coverage from the immediate Cassopolis/Dowagiac area to include a larger portion of southwestern Michigan as well as the Elkhart, Indiana, area. Effective January 25, 2018, the translator moved to 96.7 MHz, as W244DS. The translator was moved in fall of 2018 to 97.1 with tower located to provide local coverage of South Bend Indiana and Niles Michigan. The South Bend location gives Larry Langford a second South Bend opportunity as he was the original owner and founder of WUBU in South Bend known as Mix 106. He transferred those call letters from Portage, Michigan, where he owned WUBU (96.5 FM), before bringing in partner Abe Thompson and moving WUBU to South Bend. Kool FM now resides on a tower owned by Federated Media.

On July 4, 2020, the station was changed over to the MeTV FM radio format from Weigel Broadcasting; the station is cross-promoted on Weigel's three area television stations, including WBND-LD2, an owned-and-operated MeTV station. The shift was made in an effort to differentiate its playlist from higher-rated classic hits stations while still maintaining a familiar format to the station's loyal listeners, along with bringing a station with a cult following from the area's Chicago area commuters into the South Bend market.

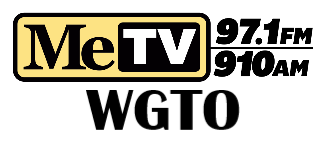
Logo before 96.7 translator sign on

Since the summer of 2021 WGTO has also been heard on a second translator, W248AP (97.5 FM) in Valparaiso, Indiana.

On April 7, 2025, WGTO changed their format from soft oldies to gold hot adult contemporary, branded as "97.1 The Ride".

== Translators ==
Broadcast translators for WGTO
Call sign	Frequency	City of license	FID	ERP (W)	HAAT	Class	Transmitter coordinates	FCC info
W244EO	96.7 FM	Dowagiac, Michigan	152865	250	51.8 m (170 ft)	D	41°57′14.17″N 86°0′59.03″W	LMS
W246DV	97.1 FM	South Bend, Indiana	89020	250	0 m (0 ft)	D	41°44′16.2″N 86°15′10″W	LMS
W248AP	97.5 FM	Valparaiso, Indiana	143899	250	0 m (0 ft)	D	41°31′22″N 87°1′28″W	LMS
