= WION (AM) =

Radio station in Ionia, Michigan

- Ionia, Michigan; United States
- Broadcast area: Ionia, Michigan; Lowell, Michigan
- Frequency: 1430 kHz C-QUAM AM stereo
- Branding: I-1430

Programming
- Format: Full-service adult hits

Ownership
- Owner: Packer Radio WION, LLC
- Sister stations: WGLM

History
- First air date: February 1, 1953
- Call sign meaning: Ionia

Technical information
- Licensing authority: FCC
- Facility ID: 39533
- Class: B
- Power: 4,700 watts day; 330 watts night
- Transmitter coordinates: 43°0′16.12″N 85°5′9.03″W
- Translator: See § Translators

Links
- Public license information: Public file; LMS
- Webcast: Listen live
- Website: www.i1430.com

WION (1430 kHz, "I-1430") is a commercial full-service AM radio station licensed to serve Ionia, Michigan. The station is owned by Packer Radio WION, LLC and features a mix of locally programmed music, news, and sports. WION transmits in C-QUAM AM stereo.

== History ==
WION began broadcasting on February 1, 1953. It originally operated during daytime hours only with 500 watts.

The station was granted a construction permit by the Federal Communications Commission (FCC) on August 14, 1961, to increase power from 500 watts to 5,000 watts and install a directional antenna. The FCC granted the station a new license with the upgraded facilities on October 1, 1964.

The FCC granted the station a new license effective May 23, 1995, allowing for nighttime operation with 330 watts using a directional antenna. On April 30, 2007, the FCC granted a construction permit to reduce daytime power from 5,000 watts to 4,700 watts and change from a directional to a non-directional antenna. No changes were to be made to nighttime facilities. The FCC granted the station a new license with the updated facilities on November 11, 2009.

In 2009, the station added an FM translator on 92.7 MHz purchased from Horizon Christian Fellowship, which changed frequencies from its original 103.7 MHz. The translator moved to the station's studios on Haynor Road in Ionia and covers all of Ionia County.

WION added FM translator W262DN in Lowell, Michigan, in 2019 to serve Eastern Kent County and the city of Lowell. It operates from the (Lowell) city-owned tower and shares a broadcast antenna with the Lowell Area Schools' LPFM station.

WION began online streaming of its programming on February 1, 2013, on the 60th anniversary of the station's first airdate.

== Translators ==
WION programming is broadcast on the following translators:

Call sign	Frequency (MHz)	City of license	Facility ID	Class	ERP (W)	Height (m (ft))	Transmitter coordinates
W224BZ	92.7	Ionia, Michigan	152369	D	250	63 m (207 ft)	43°00′16.1″N 85°05′9.0″W
W262DN	100.3	Ionia, Michigan	202467	D	250	17 m (56 ft)	42°56′30.1″N 85°20′3.1″W
