= WRHC-LP =

- Three Oaks, Michigan; United States
- Frequency: 106.7 MHz

Ownership
- Owner: Harbor Arts

Technical information
- Licensing authority: FCC
- Facility ID: 126310
- Class: L1
- ERP: 53 watts
- HAAT: 41.2 meters (135 ft)
- Transmitter coordinates: 41°48′04.0″N 86°36′52.8″W

Links
- Public license information: LMS
- Website: http://www.radioharborcountry.org/

WRHC-LP (106.7 FM) is a radio station licensed to Three Oaks, Michigan, United States. The station is currently owned by Harbor Arts.
