= WBCH (AM) =

Coordinates: 42°37′34″N 85°16′41″W

- Hastings, Michigan; United States
- Broadcast area: (Daytime) (Nighttime)
- Frequency: 1220 kHz
- Branding: NewsTalk 1220

Programming
- Format: News/Talk
- Affiliations: Michigan Radio Network

Ownership
- Owner: Barry Broadcasting

History
- First air date: 1958
- Call sign meaning: Barry County Hastings

Technical information
- Licensing authority: FCC
- Class: D
- Power: 250 watts (Daytime); 48 watts (Nighttime)

Links
- Public license information: Public file; LMS
- Website: http://www.wbch.com/

WBCH (1220 AM) is a radio station licensed to Hastings, Michigan broadcasting a news/talk format.

== Sources ==
- Michiguide.com - WBCH History
