= WCZY-FM =

Radio station in Mount Pleasant, Michigan

Coordinates: 43.594°N 84.824°W

- Mt. Pleasant, Michigan; United States
- Broadcast area: Mt. Pleasant/Alma/Clare
- Frequency: 104.3 MHz
- Branding: My 104-3; Central Michigan's Best Variety

Programming
- Format: Adult hits (Hybrid of Adult contemporary and Classic hits)

Ownership
- Owner: Robert and Laurie Peters; (Latitude Media, LLC)
- Sister stations: WMMI

History
- First air date: August 20, 1991
- Former call signs: WMMI-FM (5/19/89-9/7/89, CP)
- Call sign meaning: CoZY FM (former branding)

Technical information
- Licensing authority: FCC
- Facility ID: 9920
- Class: A
- ERP: 3,000 watts
- HAAT: 100 meters

Links
- Public license information: Public file; LMS
- Webcast: Listen Live
- Website: wczy.net

WCZY-FM (104.3) is a radio station located in Mt. Pleasant, Michigan. Specializing in adult hits music, the station has been on the air since 1991.

On weekday mornings, WCZY regularly aired "That Show with Tina and Shawn." As of March 2025, the current weekday morning host is DJ Roberts.

== History ==
=== Beginnings ===
The history of WCZY can be traced back to October 2, 1986, when the construction permit to build the station was first granted.

The call letters initially assigned to the station in 1989 were WMMI, to mirror that of its daytime-only AM sister station. However, these call letters would never be used, with the call letters changing to WCZY by the end of the year.

The WCZY call letters had belonged to a heritage easy-listening radio station (nee WLDM) in Detroit known today as CHR formatted Channel 955. That station, known then as "Cozy FM", was a rating powerhouse in its heyday. Like many other easy-listening stations in the mid-1980s, it had moved away from its successful format once ratings began dropping, and adopted a CHR format under the name "Z95.5." In July 1989, Detroit's WCZY changed its call letters to WKQI, and the WCZY calls became available for the new Mount Pleasant station.

Upon this change, it was decided that the new FM station would become an easy listening station, targeting a demographic that included travelers from downstate and the academic community at Central Michigan University, one of the largest colleges in Michigan and Mount Pleasant's largest employer at the time.

=== Debut as Cozy 104.3 ===
Due to delays brought on by a sudden change in ownership in 1988, WCZY finally went on air on August 20, 1991. The station aired with its intended easy listening format, and was provided jointly by Englewood, Colorado-based syndicator Jones Radio Network, and Salt Lake City-based Bonneville Broadcasting.

The DJ-less, satellite-delivered format aimed to focus more on music by reducing DJ chatter and limiting commercials.

=== Format Change to AC ===
By 1993, a format change was forced when Jones Radio Network ended the easy-listening format partnership with Bonneville Broadcasting. At that time Bonneville Broadcasting had merged with Broadcast Programming. This tape-based music format provider had no desire to enter the dwindling, easy-listening radio programming market. WCZY then took the cue of many easy-listening stations who had migrated to a soft adult contemporary format while still branding themselves as easy listening by re-affiliating with Jones' "Soft Hits" light adult contemporary format.

Since then (now under the Westwood One umbrella), WCZY has transitioned to programming of mainly local origin and has also dropped its former "Lite Hits" slogan, now identifying as simply "My 104~3". With the change to My 104-3 on April 19, 2011, the station added more 1970s and 1980s classic hits to its music mix, and is now more of an adult hits station than its former adult contemporary sound.

=== Station Sale ===
Latitude Media purchased WCZY and AM sister station WMMI in 2013 for $779,000. The format offerings remain the same.

== Sports programming ==
In addition to standard music programming, WCZY-FM and its sister station WMMI-AM also provide coverage of local high school sports in the Mid-Michigan area. with play-by-play from Chris Spachman.

The two stations cover Mount Pleasant, Mount Pleasant Sacred Heart, Beal City, and Clare High School athletic events, including a variety of events, including football, as well as both boys' and girls basketball and baseball.

== Local concerts, events, and other programming ==
WCZY organizes several events throughout the year in mid-Michigan, some being:

- Hometown Showdown: A free talent show at the Isabella County Fairgrounds
- Boo Bash: Indoor trick-or-treating held each October inside the ICE Arena & Morey Courts for kids.
- Under the Big Top – A "fun-filled day" at Finch Fieldhouse on the campus of CMU.

Previously, WCZY was closely associated with Clare Summerfest, the Farwell Lumberjack Festival, the Farwell Labor Day Festival, the Alma Highland Festival, the Shepherd Maple Syrup Festival, and a host of other local community events in Isabella, Gratiot, and Clare counties, often broadcasting from those locations.
