= Michigan Farm Radio Network =

Agricultural radio network in Michigan, United States

The Michigan Farm Radio Network (MFRN) was a radio network that provided specialty programming geared toward farmers in Michigan.

The network began broadcasting from Howard Heath's farm house basement in 1970. Heath was the first recipient of Michigan Farm Bureau's "Agriculture Communicator of the Year Award" in 1975. He died in 1979.

Robert T. "Bob" Driscoll, who started his radio career at WLEW in Bad Axe, worked with Heath and later with his son Patrick T. "Pat" Driscoll. Under Bob's management, MFRN became the second largest regional farm radio network in the country. It grew into several sub-stations, and began broadcasting in its own station in Milan, Michigan in 1976. Pat Driscoll led the station for several years, until the Driscolls sold the network to Saga Communications in 2000.

Bob and Pat Driscoll were long-term members of the National Association of Farm Broadcasters and held seats on that organization's Board of Directors and its various committees. Bob was recognized by the Michigan Farm Bureau in 1981, 1983 and 1986 for his service to agriculture. Bob Driscoll died in 2001; in 2004, he was inducted posthumously into the Michigan Broadcasting Hall of Fame.

In 1993, Pat Driscoll was awarded the Michigan FFA Foundation "Distinguished Service Award", in recognition of the support given to the Michigan FFA Foundation and the Michigan Association of FFA. In 1996, he received the "Meritorious Service Award for Producer Communications" in Broadcast by the United Soybean Board; in the same year, the Michigan Veterinary Medical Association recognized him and the MFRN with its "MVMA Public Media Award" for promoting the importance of the veterinarian in animal agriculture. In 2000, he was named as an honorary member of the Michigan Association of Agriscience Educators. He was awarded an Oscar in Broadcasting for his leadership in reporting on the tuberculosis problem in Michigan's whitetail deer and its threat to Michigan agriculture.

As of 2005, Dennis Mellott was the President of Networks and General Manager, formerly vice-president and General Manager.

In March 2015, Michigan Farm Radio Network ceased operations and was replaced by Brownfield Ag News, after being acquired by Brownfield.
