= WAGN (AM) =

Coordinates: 45°06′27″N 87°36′25″W

- Menominee, Michigan; United States
- Broadcast area
- Frequency: 1340 kHz
- Branding: 1340 News Talk WAGN

Programming
- Format: News / Talk (as of January 5, 2009)
- Affiliations: Michigan Radio Network

Ownership
- Owner: Radio Plus Bay Cities, LLC
- Sister stations: WHYB, WLST, WMAM, WSFQ

Technical information
- Licensing authority: FCC
- Facility ID: 24584
- Class: C
- Power: 1,000 watts
- Translators: W261DM (100.1 MHz, Menominee) (106.1 MHz) W291DP (Menominee)

Links
- Public license information: Public file; LMS
- Website: Official Website

WAGN (1340 AM) is a radio station licensed to Menominee, Michigan broadcasting an oldies and talk format.

Formerly an affiliate of ABC Radio's OldiesRadio network, the web site dx-midAMerica reported in January 2008 that the station had dropped Oldies Radio in favor of local voicetracking with the new moniker "1340 Gold" (1). Prior to affiliating with Oldies Radio, WAGN had programmed Adult Standards as an affiliate of the Westwood One/Dial Global America's Best Music network.

In late December 2008, WAGN began to simulcast its oldies format on its FM sister WHYB 103.7 FM (formerly an adult contemporary-formatted station). WAGN will launch a News/Talk format featuring hosts such as Dave Ramsey, Rush Limbaugh, and Laura Ingraham on January 5, 2009, while the Oldies format will move permanently to 103.7 FM. (1)
