= WQXO =

Coordinates: 46°24′30″N 86°38′22″W

- Munising, Michigan; United States
- Frequency: 1400 kHz

Programming
- Format: Christian adult contemporary
- Network: K-Love

Ownership
- Owner: K-Love Inc.

History
- First air date: September 20, 1955 (as WMAB)
- Former call signs: WGON (1965-8/29/78); WMAB (1955–1965)

Technical information
- Licensing authority: FCC
- Facility ID: 41826
- Class: C
- Power: 1,000 watts unlimited
- Translator: 97.7 W249DR (Munising)

Links
- Public license information: Public file; LMS
- Website: klove.com

WQXO (1400 AM) is a radio station licensed to Munising, Michigan. It broadcasts a Christian adult contemporary music format. WQXO-AM.jpg

== History ==
WQXO signed on in 1955 as WMAB "Munising Alger Broadcasting" operating from studios above the First National Bank building (now City Hall). Owned by The Munising News, WMAB operated daytime only at first, later staying on the air until 10pm nightly. The call letters were changed to WGON "Wagon Radio" (similar to Menominee's WAGN). In 1974 an FM CP was obtained and signed on as WQXO with a plan to be a separate format from WGON. The separate programming didn't materialize and WQXO signed on simulcasting WGON's programming. A mix of top 40 and beautiful music jingles edited made for an interesting station image. Studios were located at The Broadcast House on Onota street and remained there until a move to Marquette in the late '00's. The WGON call letters were dropped in 1978 and both WQXO AM/FM simulcast. For a short time in '81-83 WQXO emulated WJML-Petoskey with a sound-alike presentation. WQXO previously aired an oldies format with local morning programming from a local restaurant. K-Love Inc. eventually bought WQXO and it now airs a Christian adult contemporary format.

Former logo

== Sources ==
- Michiguide.com - WQXO History
