= WBCH-FM =

Coordinates: 42.626°N 85.278°W

- Hastings, Michigan; United States
- Broadcast area
- Frequency: 100.1 MHz

Programming
- Format: Country

Ownership
- Owner: Barry Broadcasting

History
- First air date: 1967
- Former call signs: WBCH (5/31/79-5/19/82); WBCH-FM (1967-5/31/79)
- Call sign meaning: World's Best Country Hits

Technical information
- Licensing authority: FCC
- Facility ID: 3989
- Class: A
- ERP: 3,000 watts
- HAAT: 90 meters

Links
- Public license information: Public file; LMS
- Webcast: Listen Live
- Website: wbch.com

WBCH-FM (100.1 FM) is a radio station licensed to Hastings, Michigan broadcasting a country music format.

== Bronco Radio Network ==
WBCH is an affiliate of the Western Michigan University "Broncos Radio Network" and carries all of the Broncos football and men's hockey games.
