= WMOM =

Coordinates: 43.869°N 86.359°W

- Pentwater, Michigan; United States
- Broadcast area: Ludington, Michigan
- Frequency: 102.7 MHz
- Branding: WMOM 102.7

Programming
- Format: Mainstream CHR

Ownership
- Owner: Hit Radio Media, LLC

History
- First air date: September 26, 1999
- Call sign meaning: Mason, Oceana, and Manistee Counties, the station's primary service area

Technical information
- Licensing authority: FCC
- Facility ID: 76507
- Class: A
- ERP: 6,000 watts
- HAAT: 100 meters

Links
- Public license information: Public file; LMS
- Webcast: Listen live
- Website: 1027wmom.com

WMOM (102.7 FM) is a radio station broadcasting a Mainstream CHR format.

Licensed to Pentwater, Michigan, it serves the Ludington, Michigan area. It first began broadcasting in 1999.

== History ==
WMOM is owned by Hit Radio Media, LLC. The station broadcasts live from a storefront studio windows at 206 Ludington Avenue in the historic section of Ludington, Michigan. Patrick Lopeman launched WMOM in 1999. The station was later sold 19 years later to Hit Radio Media, LLC and the new group officially took over in May 2020.

WMOM was twice nominated at the NAB Marconi CHR station of the year in 2003 and 2004. WMOM also won Station of the Year from the Michigan Association of Broadcasters in 2017.

Every year, WMOM had sponsored the annual "Lake Jump", a fundraiser that has contributed $175,768.70 to charities and building projects in western Michigan. This was later given to a board as the station was unable to handle the complete responsibilities of the event. The station's slogan resembles its branding, "Always Listen To Your Mom". Despite its branding and slogan, WMOM does not lean towards misandry.

The station evolved from a Top 40 (CHR) to a Top 40 (CHR)/Alternative hybrid mix by 2007. The formula, according to the station owner, was "two-thirds Top 40 and one-third Alternative." WMOM also played unreleased demos of local and regional artists. Today it is a true Hot Adult Contemporary with the latest top 40 hits being added into rotation weekly.

On April 1, 2019, WMOM abruptly went silent, with equipment removed from the studios. According to a Facebook post on the WMOM Sports Team page, station owner Patrick Lopeman had recently been involved in a serious auto accident, which made him re-evaluate his activities in managing the business. It was also rumored that he was having financial issues to be able to maintain the station. With his 70th birthday approaching, he realized he was long past retirement age and couldn't keep up with the schedule or bills required to operate the radio station, therefore he immediately ceased operation without any advanced notice. Given the timing of the station going off the air, many thought it was an April Fool's Day prank.

On March 25, 2020, the new owners, Hit Radio Media, LLC brought WMOM-FM back on the air with a temporary Christmas Music format. which introduced the sound back to the listeners radio.

On April 6, 2020, it was announced on-air that there was new ownership of the station. An entity called Hit Radio Media, LLC purchased the station, with the sale closing late May 2020.

In 2025, Chris Nicholas purchased the station for $47,558.
