= WJSZ =

Coordinates: 43.182°N 84.451°W

- Ashley, Michigan; United States
- Broadcast area
- Frequency: 92.5 MHz
- Branding: Z92.5, The Castle

Programming
- Format: Hot adult contemporary

Ownership
- Owner: Krol Communications

History
- First air date: 1991

Technical information
- Licensing authority: FCC
- Facility ID: 51080
- Class: A
- ERP: 4,000 watts
- HAAT: 122 meters

Links
- Public license information: Public file; LMS
- Webcast: Listen Live
- Website: z925.com

WJSZ is an FM radio station operating on 92.5 MHz from Ashley, Michigan, United States, with 4,000 watts. The station features a hot adult contemporary format targeting the Owosso, Michigan area.

The call letters were assigned on December 13, 1991, and the station came on the air shortly thereafter with an "Oldies and More" format playing songs from the 1950s, 1960s, and 1970s.

In 1999 Owosso Broadcasting, the original owners, sold the station to Curwood Broadcasting which repositioned it as Z92.5 "The Castle." The Castle refers to Curwood Castle, the former home of the writer James Curwood located in Owosso, Michigan. The station began referred to itself as "All Request Radio" and "Z92.5 The Castle, Playing the Hits You Want to Hear." Eventually the station dropped the "All Request" angle and evolved into a very broad-based Modern Rock/Classic Hits hybrid.

WJSZ ran into financial problems and went into receivership in 2005. On January 9, 2006, it was purchased by Krol Communications for $650,000. Its format changed to Hot Adult Contemporary "playing the hits of the ’80s, ’90s and now." Along with music, the station has a strong emphasis on local news and high school sports. Doing the Friday night Basketball Games and state playoffs are Ted Fattal and Joe Smith, both are Corunna Grads.

WJSZ broadcasts from a 400-foot tower in Ashley, Michigan, with studios in Owosso, Michigan. Its signal covers the towns of Owosso, Corunna, Chesaning, Durand, Perry, Ashley, St. Johns, and Alma. With the move in late 2006 of WJZL (now WLMI) from 92.7 MHz to 92.9 MHz, the station can now be heard in Lansing, Michigan.

== Sources ==
- Michiguide.com - WJSZ History
