= WAKV =

Coordinates: 42°27′33″N 85°43′58″W

- Otsego, Michigan; United States
- Broadcast area: (Daytime) (Nighttime)
- Frequency: 980 kHz
- Branding: 98.9 Jethro FM

Programming
- Format: Classic country
- Affiliations: Great Lakes Radio Network and USA Network

Ownership
- Owner: Vintage Radio Enterprises, LLC

History
- First air date: 1958 (as WDMC)
- Former call signs: WQXC (6/29/84-9/4/98); WOAM (2/9/81-6/29/84); WAOP (?-2/9/81); WDMC (1958-?)

Technical information
- Licensing authority: FCC
- Facility ID: 22122
- Class: D
- Power: 1,000 watts (Daytime); 101 watts (Nighttime)
- Translators: 98.9 W255DF (Otsego); 105.1 W286AU (Kalamazoo)

Links
- Public license information: Public file; LMS
- Website: jethro.fm

WAKV (980 AM) is a radio station broadcasting a classic country format. Licensed to Otsego, Michigan, it first began broadcasting in 1958 with the WDMC call sign.

In February 2021, WAKV changed their format from adult standards/oldies to classic country, branded as "98.9 Jethro FM".
