= WGLM =

WGLM and WGLM-FM
WGLM: Greenville, Michigan; WGLM-FM: Lakeview, Michigan; United States
- Frequencies: WGLM: 1380 kHz; WGLM-FM: 106.3 MHz
- Branding: M106.3 / M1380

Programming
- Format: Full-service adult hits
- Affiliations: SRN News

Ownership
- Owner: Packer Radio
- Sister stations: WION

History
- First air date: WGLM: 1960; WGLM-FM: 1989
- Former call signs: WGLM: WPLB (1960–2000); WSCG (2000–2008); WGLM-FM: WRIZ-FM (1988–1993); WPLB-FM (1993–2000); WSCG-FM (2000–2008)
- Call sign meaning: Greenville, Lakeview, Montcalm and Mecosta Counties

Technical information
- Licensing authority: FCC
- Facility ID: WGLM: 35423; WGLM-FM: 35422
- Class: WGLM: B; WGLM-FM: A
- Power: WGLM: 1,000 watts (daytime); 500 watts (nighttime)
- ERP: WGLM-FM: 3,000 watts
- HAAT: WGLM-FM: 100 meters (330 ft)
- Transmitter coordinates: WGLM: 43°9′30.1″N 85°15′16.1″W; WGLM-FM: 43°24′18.1″N 85°15′56.1″W
- Translator(s): WGLM: 101.9 W270DN (Greenville)

Links
- Public license information: WGLM: Public file; LMS; WGLM-FM: Public file; LMS
- Webcast: Listen live
- Website: www.m1063.com

WGLM (1380 AM) and WGLM-FM (106.3 FM) are radio stations owned by Packer Radio, owners of radio station WION in nearby Ionia. WGLM is licensed to Greenville and WGLM-FM to Lakeview. They broadcast a full-service mix of music, news and sports.

WGLM and WGLM-FM are airing a full-service mix of top-40 music from 1960 to 2006. The two stations are simulcast full-time. Packer Radio bought the stations from Stafford Broadcasting in October 2008. Stafford owned both stations after acquiring them from Kortes Communications in 2000.

== History ==
AM 1380 was originally WPLB, which featured a country format for many years. In October 2000, the station became WSCG and moved to a satellite-fed adult standards format from Westwood One. WSCG switched to a simulcast of CNN Headline News in October 2002 and the following year added more talk programming, much of it from the Michigan Talk Radio Network.

WGLM-FM 106.3 was originally WRIZ and became WPLB-FM in 1993. The station became WSCG-FM in October 2000 following its sale to Stafford Broadcasting, and in January 2001 switched from country music to a talk format as "106 The Source", the flagship station for the then-new Michigan Talk Radio Network. After a little more than six months, "106 The Source" was replaced by Jones Radio Network's "Classic Hit Country" format. WSCG-FM switched from "Classic Hit Country" to Jones' "True Country" in February 2006.

The original WPLB-FM 107.3, became WODJ with an oldies format in 1989 and later became WBBL-FM. The 107.3 facility has since moved its studios to Grand Rapids, and it and 1380 AM are no longer co-owned. On December 19, 2008, the WSCG and WSCG-FM call signs were changed to WGLM and WGLM-FM. After Christmas of 2008, the stations adopted a full-service mix of music, news and sports. In August 2010, WGLM switched from a simulcast of WGLM-FM to a classic country format. The stations are now known as "M106-3" and "M-1380".

The WGLM calls, which stand for "Greenville, Lakeview and Montcalm/Mecosta counties," were most recently used at a former adult contemporary FM station in West Lafayette, Indiana, which now airs adult contemporary programming as WLQQ.
