= Northern Star Broadcasting =

Radio station owner in Michigan, United States

Northern Star Broadcasting (formerly known as Calibre Communications) was a radio broadcasting company which owned various radio stations in Michigan from 1998 to 2016, with offices in Cheboygan and Traverse City. Northern Star was owned by Reynolds Communications, ran by Del & Mary Reynolds.

At one time or another, Northern Star Broadcasting owned eleven stations in Northern Michigan (nine as of 2016) and previously fourteen additional stations in Michigan's Upper Peninsula, exiting Upper Peninsula markets in 2010 & 2011 after selling all but one repeater station to new owners, largely Sovereign Communications of Sault Ste. Marie, Michigan in February 2010. Despite the sales, Northern Star's stations in Cheboygan, Mackinaw City, and Indian River could still be heard in much of the Eastern Upper Peninsula.

In May 2016, and due to Northern Star vice president Mary Reynolds' health concerns, Reynolds Communications announced the sale of all but one of Northern Star's remaining radio stations to Black Diamond Broadcast Holdings (who previously owned WUPS in Harrison and WTWS in Houghton Lake) in a transaction worth $1,950,000, with WCKC in Cadillac instead being sold to Up North Radio (who own WCDY in McBain) for $180,000. Despite the sales of their remaining radio stations, Reynolds Communications will retain ownership of these stations' tower sites.

== Radio Stations ==
=== Northern Michigan ===
All Northern Michigan stations were sold to Black Diamond Broadcasting in 2016 unless otherwise stated

- 93.9 FM WAVC (Mio; sold to Michigan Broadcasters in 2013)
- 94.5 FM WLJZ (Mackinaw City; sold to Michigan Broadcasters in 2013)
- 95.5 FM WQEZ (Glen Arbor)
- 97.7 FM WCHY (Cheboygan)
- 98.1 FM WGFN (Glen Arbor)
- 102.9 FM WMKC (Indian River, previously St. Ignace)
- 103.7 FM W279CC (Alpena)
- 105.1 FM WGFM (Cheboygan)
- 106.3 FM WOEZ (Onaway)
- 107.1 FM WCKC (Cadillac; sold to Up North Radio in 2016)
- 1240 AM WCBY (Cheboygan)

=== Western Upper Peninsula ===
All of Northern Star Broadcasting's stations in Michigan's Western Upper Peninsula were sold to Sovereign Communications in 2010

- 92.3 FM WJPD (Ishpeming)
- 93.1 FM WIMK (Iron Mountain)
- 94.1 FM WUPK (Marquette)
- 94.3 FM WZNL (Norway)
- 99.5 FM WNGE (Negaunee)
- 1240 AM WIAN (Ishpeming)
- 1320 AM WDMJ (Marquette)
- 1450 AM WMIQ (Iron Mountain)

=== Eastern Upper Peninsula ===
- 97.9 FM WIHC (Newberry; sold to West Central Michigan Media Ministries in 2011)
- 99.5 FM WYSS (Sault Ste. Marie; sold to Sovereign Communications in 2010)
- 100.7 FM W264CF (St. Ignace; sold to Black Diamond Broadcasting in 2016)
- 105.5 FM WMKD (Pickford; sold to Sovereign Communications in 2010)
- 940 AM WIDG (St. Ignace; sold to Baraga Broadcasting in 2008)
- 1400 AM WKNW (Sault Ste. Marie; sold to Sovereign Communications in 2010)

== Sources ==
- Michiguide.com - Northern Star Broadcasting
