= WWSS =

Simulcasts WGFN Glen Arbor
- Tuscarora Township, Michigan; United States
- Broadcast area: Petoskey, Michigan; Cheboygan, Michigan; Boyne City, Michigan; Gaylord, Michigan
- Frequency: 95.3 MHz
- Branding: The Bear

Programming
- Language: English
- Format: Classic rock
- Affiliations: United Stations Radio Networks; Westwood One; Detroit Lions Radio Network; Detroit Tigers Radio Network

Ownership
- Owner: Black Diamond Broadcasting Holdings, LLC
- Sister stations: WCBY, WGFE, WGFM, WGFN, WMKC, WWMK, WTWS, WUPS

History
- First air date: 2012
- Call sign meaning: StraitS (previous format)

Technical information
- Licensing authority: FCC
- Facility ID: 170939
- Class: C2
- ERP: 17,000 watts
- HAAT: 165 meters (541 ft)
- Transmitter coordinates: 45°21′07″N 84°35′38″W

Links
- Public license information: Public file; LMS
- Webcast: Listen live
- Website: www.classicrockthebear.com

WWSS (95.3 FM) is a radio station licensed to Tuscarora Township, Michigan, United States. The station airs a classic rock format and is currently owned by Black Diamond Broadcasting Holdings, LLC. The station previously aired a country music format before trading signals with Black Diamond Broadcasting classic rock station 97.7 WCHY, with WCHY becoming Straits Country's new signal on March 12, 2018. It is part of a simulcast with 98.1 WGFN.

WWSS's logo under previous country format

WWSS’s logo before 95.1 translator sign on
