= WGFN =

Coordinates: 44.821°N 85.996°W

- Glen Arbor, Michigan; United States
- Broadcast area: Traverse City, Michigan
- Frequency: 98.1 MHz
- Branding: The Bear

Programming
- Language: English
- Format: Classic rock
- Affiliations: United Stations Radio Networks; Westwood One; Detroit Lions Radio Network; Detroit Tigers Radio Network

Ownership
- Owner: Black Diamond Broadcast Holdings
- Sister stations: WCBY, WGFE, WGFM, WMKC, WWMK, WTWS, WUPS, WWSS

History
- First air date: 1991 (as WMLB)
- Former call signs: WMLB (10/12/88–5/22/92)
- Call sign meaning: W-Gold FM (previous branding, similar to WGFM)

Technical information
- Licensing authority: FCC
- Facility ID: 10750
- Class: C2
- ERP: 21,000 watts
- HAAT: 225 meters (738 ft)
- Translator: 95.1 W236BU (Traverse City)
- Repeater: 95.3 WWSS (Tuscarora Township)

Links
- Public license information: Public file; LMS
- Webcast: Listen Live
- Website: classicrockthebear.com

WGFN (98.1 FM) is a radio station in Northern Michigan that airs a classic rock format under the branding of "The Bear", and is currently owned by Black Diamond Broadcast Holdings, LLC. WGFN is based out of Glen Arbor, Michigan, airing at 98.1 FM to the Traverse City market. WGFN has been the flagship station of the Bear network of classic rock stations that have aired in Northern Michigan since the early 2000s, which peaked with 4 regional stations from 2002-2009 and 2010-2012. The only other surviving Bear station in the region is 95.3 WWSS, which airs the same programming and playlist as WGFN, but features differing station identifications and commercial content for its market. The Bear aired the popular syndicated morning radio program The Bob & Tom Show until September 2017, and currently airs Detroit Tigers baseball games and Detroit Lions football games. The current lineup includes Smitty in morning drive, "California Girl" Nicole Pence in mid-days, and Jay Roberts on afternoon drive.

Until 2009, WGFN was joined by 97.9 WIHC in Newberry, 105.1 WGFM in Cheboygan, and 107.1 WCKC in Cadillac in Northern Star Broadcasting's then-Classic Rock: The Bear network. WGFM became a partial simulcast of Glen Arbor mainstream rock station WJZJ in September 2009, and continues to broadcast the format under the Rock 105 branding. In February 2010, WIHC was taken dark by Northern Star in the wake of their sale of most Upper Peninsula radio stations to Sovereign Communications, before being sold to new owners and relaunched as the religious simulcast Strong Tower Radio in 2012. Fellow Upper Peninsula stations WUPK & WIMK (which shared the Classic Rock: The Bear branding but were otherwise not linked) were also sold to Sovereign Communications in 2010.

Northern Star replenished the four station Bear network in 2010 by converting two then-country stations into Bear affiliates, replacing WGFM with 94.5 WLJZ (later WOEZ) in Mackinaw City, and adding 93.9 WAVC in Mio to the network, but both stations were transferred to Michigan Broadcasters in separate deals in 2012 & 2013 to become Your Patriot Voice talk radio stations, with WCHY (formerly WQEZ) changing formats in 2013 to effectively replace WLJZ in the Mackinaw City region. WCKC in Cadillac was ultimately sold to Up North Media in 2016 and re-imaged as 107.1 The Drive during Northern Star Broadcasting's sale of their remaining radio stations, though it retains a classic rock format. On March 12, 2018, Black Diamond Broadcasting traded WCHY for Darby Advertising's WWSS (95.3 FM), which currently airs the classic rock format.

== Beginnings: W-Gold FM ==
In 1989, longtime northern Michigan radio personality and engineer Del Reynolds and wife Mary purchased 100,000 watt CHR WQLZ (formerly WCBY-FM) in Cheboygan. Shortly afterward, he changed the station's format to classic rock with the WGFM call letters, meaning "W-Gold-FM". The station's original format was an oldies/classic rock mix, and also played new cuts from classic rock artists as well. The station was live/local 6 a.m. until 6 p.m. and aired Westwood One's Adult Rock format overnights. Del was the station's morning man. In 1992, WGFM/WGFN flipped to the current classic rock format, after competing station WAIR was doing better with the oldies format.

Throughout the 1990s, Del's radio empire grew when he acquired many other local stations and built new ones as well. He purchased WIDG 940 in St. Ignace, MI and WCBY AM in Cheboygan the station that launched his career in the late 1960s. In 1992, he purchased 98.1 WMLB Glen Arbor, which had previously simulcast WUPS in Houghton Lake, and changed that to WGFN, giving WGFM a clearer signal in the Traverse City, MI area. He also took over 107.1 WCKC "Cadillac KC Country" Cadillac which was simulcasting his 102.9 WMKC "KC Country" St. Ignace, MI, but eventually changing to a WGFM simulcast in 1996.

== The Bear debuts ==
In 1998, Reynolds sold his stations to Calibre Communications for $7 million. As a result, the station would remain classic rock, but under a new moniker, The Bear, and Reynolds would leave the morning show host position. When Calibre asked Reynolds who should replace him, he suggested Bob and Tom. It was a wise decision on the station's part since they would pry album-oriented rock (AOR) stalwart WKLT from the Arbitron #2 spot all the way down to #5, while in many books, The Bear is in the top five. Bob and Tom - whose radio career started at WJML in the late 1970s - are now one of the most-popular morning shows in northern Michigan.

Also, WGFN was made the flagship of The Bear stations, even though most of their operations are in Cheboygan, partially due to Traverse City being the biggest city in northern Michigan.

Unfortunately, the deal between Calibre and Reynolds failed, though a new company, Northern Star Broadcast Holdings, LLC., was formed to take over Reynolds' stations. Although no longer owner, Reynolds remained as the station's engineer.

Logo before 95.1 translator sign on
