= WQEZ (disambiguation) =

WQEZ is a radio station (1370 AM) licensed to Fort Campbell, Kentucky.

WQEZ may also refer to:

- WWMK, a radio station (106.3 FM) licensed to Onaway, Michigan, which held the call sign WQEZ in 2017
- WGFE, a radio station (95.5 FM) licensed to Glen Arbor, Michigan, which held the call sign WQEZ from 2013 to 2017
- WCHY (FM), a radio station (97.7 FM) licensed to Cheboygan, Michigan, which held the call sign WQEZ in 2013
- WHTP-FM, a radio station (104.7 FM) licensed to Kennebunkport, Maine, which held the call sign WQEZ from 1994 to 2004
- WPMJ, a radio station (94.3 FM) licensed to Chillicothe, Illinois, which held the call sign WQEZ from 1991 to 1994
- WWCN, a radio station (99.3 FM) licensed to Fort Myers Beach, Florida, which held the call sign WQEZ from 1983 to 1990
- WMJJ, a radio station (96.5 FM) licensed to Birmingham, Alabama, which held the call sign WQEZ from 1973 to 1982
