= WKKM =

WKKM may refer to:

- WKKM (FM), a radio station (89.7 FM) licensed to serve Speaker Township, Michigan, United States
- WKKM-LP, a radio station (106.5 FM) licensed to serve Harrison, Michigan
- WSFP, a radio station (88.1 FM) licensed to serve Harrisville, Michigan, which held the call sign WKKM from 2004 to 2008
