= WGFM =

Coordinates: 44.821°N 85.996°W

- Cheboygan, Michigan; United States
- Broadcast area: Petoskey, Michigan
- Frequency: 105.1 MHz
- Branding: Rock 105 & 95.5

Programming
- Format: Active rock

Ownership
- Owner: Black Diamond Broadcast Holdings, LLC.
- Sister stations: WCBY, WCHY, WGFE, WGFN, WWMK, WMKC, WTWS, WUPS

History
- First air date: August 15, 1968 (as WCBY-FM)
- Former call signs: WCBY-FM (1968-09/13/1982); WQLZ (09/13/1982-02/10/1989)
- Call sign meaning: Gold FM (former name)

Technical information
- Licensing authority: FCC
- Facility ID: 56073
- Class: C1
- ERP: 43,000 watts
- HAAT: 295 meters (968 ft)
- Translator: 103.7 W279CC (Alpena)
- Repeater: 95.5 WGFE (Glen Arbor)

Links
- Public license information: Public file; LMS
- Webcast: Listen Live
- Website: rock105.fm

WGFM (105.1 FM) is a radio station licensed to Cheboygan, Michigan that airs a mainstream rock format branded as Rock 105 & 95.5. WGFM boasts a 43,000-watt signal which easily covers most of northern Lower Michigan from Grayling northward and extends into the eastern Upper Peninsula. WGFE's signal serves primarily the immediate Traverse City area and carries across the waters of Lake Michigan, and can frequently be heard in Manitowoc, Wisconsin and the eastern shoreline of Door County, Wisconsin. The station is simulcast on WGFE 95.5 FM in Glen Arbor, Michigan, and is also heard on translator W279CC (103.7 FM) in Alpena.

Current on-air talent at WGFM/WGFE include morning drive host Brian "Cartman" Pfeifer, and DJs Jay Roberts, Nate "Smitty" Smith, and "NASCAR" Steve. Jay Roberts and "NASCAR" Steve are also DJs at WGFM's sister stations WGFN & WCHY, which simulcast as Classic Rock: The Bear. Each January, WGFM hosts a 12-hour marathon of Metallica music entitled the Metallica-Thon, which debuted on WGFE (then WJZJ) in 2009 shortly before entering into the first WGFM simulcast.

== History ==
WGFM originally began broadcasting on August 15, 1968 as WCBY-FM, and aired beautiful music at first until switching to a simulcast of WCBY-AM. In 1982, the station became WQLZ, and began airing a CHR format to try to compete with WKHQ, WKPK, WWPZ, and WJML, but did not have the signal to compete with the two.

In 1989, longtime northern Michigan radio personality and engineer Del Reynolds and wife Mary purchased 100,000 watt CHR WQLZ (formerly WCBY-FM) in Cheboygan. Shortly afterward, he changed the station's format to classic rock with the WGFM call letters, meaning "W-Gold-FM". The station's main focus was classic rock, but also played new cuts from classic rock artists as well. The station was live/local 6 a.m. until 6 p.m. and aired Westwood One's Adult Rock format overnights. Reynolds was the station's morning drive host at that time.

In the 1990s, Del's radio empire grew when he acquired many other local stations and built new ones as well. He purchased WIDG 940 in St. Ignace, MI and WCBY AM in Cheboygan the station that launched his career in the late 1960s. He purchased 98.1 WMLB Glen Arbor, which had previously simulcast WUPS in Houghton Lake, and changed that to WGFN, giving WGFM a clearer signal in the Traverse City, MI area. He also took over 107.1 WCKC "Cadillac KC Country" Cadillac which was simulcasting his 102.9 WMKC "KC Country" St. Ignace, MI, but eventually changing to a WGFM simulcast.

On September 14, 2009, WGFM began carrying The Free Beer and Hot Wings Show. It was also on that day when they started simulcasting |with WJZJ 95.5 as Real Rock 105 and 95-5, airing a mix of The Zone's harder rock artists such as KoRn, Metallica and Alice in Chains with harder classic rockers such as Aerosmith, Ozzy Osbourne and Van Halen. Real Rock carried The Bob and Tom Show due to the duo's ratings in the upper northern Michigan region until August 2, 2010, when Free Beer & Hot Wings replaced it. The program was dropped by WGFM in March 2013, and replaced by the local morning drive program Cartman in the Morning. On April 1, 2013, WJZJ 95.5 FM and sister station WQEZ 97.7 FM in Cheboygan swapped call letters and entered into a simulcast with 97.7 FM's soft AC format. WGFM became the sole carrier of the mainstream rock format, rebranding as "Rock 105."
