= WFDX =

Coordinates: 44.772°N 85.683°W

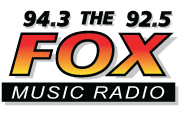
- Atlanta, Michigan; United States
- Broadcast area: Alpena-Gaylord-Petoskey
- Frequency: 92.5 MHz
- Branding: Formerly 94.3 & 92.5 The Fox FM

Programming
- Format: Adult hits

Ownership
- Owner: William C Gleich

History
- First air date: 1989 (as WAIR)
- Former call signs: WWKY (3/5/87-4/20/87); WAIR (4/20/87-1/4/99); WBYC (1/4/99-3/17/03)
- Call sign meaning: The FoX

Technical information
- Licensing authority: FCC
- Facility ID: 49573
- Class: C1
- ERP: 100,000 watts
- HAAT: 265 metres (869 ft)

Links
- Public license information: Public file; LMS

WFDX (92.5 Atlanta, Michigan) is a radio station that previously simulcasted an Adult Hits format with WFCX branded as Music Radio, The Fox FM. WFDX's 100,000-watt signal serves most of northern Michigan including Alpena, Gaylord and Petoskey, while WFCX, the flagship, served the Traverse City area with 20,500 watts. As of 2023, it broadcasts an unchanging playlist of Adult Hits that lasts approximately an hour before repeating.

WFDX signed on in 1989 as WAIR, owned by Rick Stone (who later owned WJML Radio in Petoskey). At first, they aired an adult contemporary format with WNIC/Detroit's Johnny Williams doing a voicetracked version of his "Pillow Talk" show for nights. In the early 1990s, WAIR flipped to oldies, and shortly thereafter, WIAR 94.3 signed on, simulcasting WAIR's signal. Around that time, Northern Radio took over WAIR.

On Thanksgiving 1997, WIAR flipped to country as B94.3 and their call letters changed to WBYB. WAIR remained oldies for more than a year until they started simulcasting with WBYB again under the new name B92.5/B94.3 with their call set being WBYC.

On February 24, 2003, The Bee flipped to classic hits as The Fox. Since revising its format, The Fox FM's ratings have increased noticeably, as the station has drawn listeners from competing stations WCCW-FM and WGFN.

92.5 WFDX had a slight delay from 94.3 WFCX, and thus the two signals had different liners that indicate the frequency. WFCX was identified in liners as "94-3 The Fox FM," and WFDX as "92-5 The Fox FM." However, the DJs referred to the station only as "The Fox FM."

The Fox also operated W237DA 95.3, a translator station licensed to Boyne City and serving the Petoskey area. The translator originally operated at 95.5 as W238AO and was granted its license in February 2005 after several months on the air. Listeners in the northern and eastern portions of the listening area of modern-rock station WJZJ 95.5 "The Zone" in the Traverse City area were unhappy, since W238AO interfered with WJZJ's signal as far away as Gaylord and made WJZJ completely unlistenable in areas north and west of Gaylord. However, in December 2006, W238AO was granted a construction permit to move down the dial to 95.3 with new call sign W237DA to alleviate some of the interference to WJZJ. W237DA was noted on the air at the new frequency in February 2007. W237DA was a direct rebroadcast of WFDX 92.5 until late September 2007, when the station switched to a rebroadcast of sister station WSRT. The translator has since moved to 100.5 FM as W263CD.

Under the WBYC calls, 92.5 also operated WBYC-1, a 1,000-watt booster transmitter in Petoskey; at Northern Radio's request, the FCC cancelled the license for WBYC-1 in September 2002, and the translator at 95.3 later took its place. WFDX 92.5's over-the-air signal is good in the Petoskey area, though perhaps somewhat difficult to pick up in offices.

In the fall of 2009, The Fox began identifying as "Music Radio, The Fox FM," added a jingle package similar to those of legendary Top 40 stations WABC and WLS in the 1970s, and revised the classic hits format by moving back in an oldies direction. As of August 2018, The Fox aired an Adult hits format playing songs from the '80s to today.

On December 5, 2019, the trustees of Central Michigan University approved the purchase of WFCX from Northern Radio. In the press release announcing the purchase, the trustees noted that, "Acquisition of the station will expand WCMU's reach to all of the Grand Traverse and north central Michigan regions.". The station was to sign off the air Feb 29, according to their Facebook page. Both WFCX and WFDX have since been silent. WFDX and W263CD were not included in the sale of WFCX.

Effective July 19, 2021, Northern Michigan Radio sold WFDX and W263CD to William Gleich for $180,000. W263CD's license was cancelled by the Federal Communications Commission in April 2022. The station resumed operations on April 16, 2023. As of 2023, it broadcasts a playlist that repeats, unchanged, approximately every hour. It consists of Yacht rock and other soft rock and pop hits from the 1970s and 80's, along with one short station identification read by a female voice.

== Sources ==
- Michiguide.com - WFDX History
