= WIHC =

- Newberry, Michigan; United States
- Broadcast area: Sault Ste. Marie (MI-ON)
- Frequency: 97.9 MHz
- Branding: Strong Tower Radio

Programming
- Language: English
- Format: Christian talk
- Affiliations: Strong Tower Radio; Three Angels Broadcasting Network

Ownership
- Owner: West Central Michigan Media Ministries
- Sister stations: WGCP, WUPJ, WBHL, WAVC

History
- First air date: December 1988
- Former call signs: WUPQ
- Call sign meaning: Hot Country 97.9 (previous format)

Technical information
- Licensing authority: FCC
- Facility ID: 8125
- Class: C2
- ERP: 50,000 watts
- HAAT: 150.1 meters (492 ft)
- Transmitter coordinates: 46°26′58″N 85°06′04″W

Links
- Public license information: Public file; LMS
- Website: strongtowerradio.org

WIHC (97.9 FM) is an American radio station licensed to Newberry, Michigan to serve the city of Sault Ste. Marie, Michigan. The station is owned by West Central Michigan Media Ministries, broadcasting a Christian talk radio format simulcasted from Cadillac, Michigan under the branding "Strong Tower Radio".

== History ==
WIHC has operated under numerous owners and formats since its launch in December 1988 under the ownership of Leon Van Dam, formerly the morning show host at WPHM in Port Huron, Michigan. Originally an easy listening station with the callsign WUPQ, the station was sold to Cambrian Broadcasting in 1995, who switched the station to a country music format under the branding "Hot Country 97.9", with its callsign changing to WIHC to match the new name and format. The station's license was transferred to Marathon Media in 1998, who ran the station until the fall of 2001, when WIHC was sold to Northern Star Broadcasting as part of a $7.95 million deal involving 10 other stations.

Under Northern Star's ownership, WIHC became a part of Northern Star's "Classic Rock: The Bear" network of classic rock stations in February 2002, broadcasting the same music and syndicated programs as WGFN in Glen Arbor, Michigan, but with local on-air personalities and commercials. When Northern Star Broadcasting sold off the majority of their stations in the Upper Peninsula of Michigan in February 2010 to Sault Ste. Marie company Sovereign Communications, WIHC was the only non-repeater station retained to ensure that Sovereign's ownership concentration in the Sault Ste. Marie area did not exceed U.S. Federal Communications Commission limits. However, Northern Star opted to take WIHC dark later that month, as it was no longer financially viable to keep on air. As "The Bear", WIHC remains the most recent Sault Ste. Marie-market affiliate for the syndicated Bob & Tom Show and Nights with Alice Cooper.

In November 2011, West Central Michigan Media Ministries agreed to purchase WIHC from Northern Star Broadcasting for $150,000, and the deal was finalized in February 2012. After two years of silence, WIHC was brought back on air in March 2012 as a simulcast of WGCP in Cadillac, Michigan, simulcasting its Christian talk format under the branding Strong Tower Radio. Prior to buying WIHC, West Central Michigan Media Ministries had bought the construction permit for a planned Newberry radio station (WUMI, 90.3 FM) from Korkee, Inc. in February 2011. However, it was left to expire after instead purchasing the already-completed WIHC later that year.

Following WIHC's initial closure in 2010, Northern Star Broadcasting changed the format of WLJZ 94.5 FM in Mackinaw City to a Classic Rock: The Bear affiliate, returning the network to much of the Eastern Upper Peninsula region previously covered by WIHC. In 2013, operations at this rebroadcaster later moved to WCHY 97.7 FM in Cheboygan following a station swap with Michigan Broadcasters involving WLJZ, before ultimately moving to 95.3 FM in Tuscarora Township in March 2018.
