= WMKC =

Coordinates: 45.5022°N 85.0289°W

- Indian River, Michigan; United States
- Broadcast area: Petoskey, Michigan
- Frequency: 102.9 MHz
- Branding: Big Country 102.9

Programming
- Format: Country

Ownership
- Owner: Black Diamond Broadcast Holdings, LLC.
- Sister stations: WCBY, WCHY, WGFE, WGFM, WGFN, WWMK, WTWS, WUPS

History
- First air date: January 1982
- Former call signs: WIDG (9/1/81-12/16/81, CP)
- Call sign meaning: MacKinaC

Technical information
- Licensing authority: FCC
- Facility ID: 42141
- Class: C0
- ERP: 100,000 watts
- HAAT: 336 meters

Links
- Public license information: Public file; LMS
- Webcast: Listen Live
- Website: 1029bigcountry.com

WMKC (102.9 FM) is a country radio station that is licensed to Indian River, Michigan, and serving the greater Straits of Mackinac area of Northern Michigan and the Eastern Upper Peninsula. The station is owned by Black Diamond Broadcast Group, L.L.C. and broadcasts from studios on US-23 in Cheboygan.

The station is branded as Big Country 102.9, and features the Big D and Bubba morning show, with local personalities throughout the rest of the day. The station boasts being "Northern Michigan's Most Listened to Country Station" and has consistently placed second in the overall Nielsen ratings for the market.

== History: A Dentist's Dream ==
=== Beginnings ===
WMKC ("MacKinaC"), owned by Mighty-Mac Broadcasting Corp., signed on in January 1982 by a Lansing dentist, Donald "Doc" Benson. Benson loved country music and wanted northern Michigan to have a WITL clone for when he traveled up north. He already owned an AM in St. Ignace, WIDG ("Widge By The (Mackinac) Bridge") 940. WIDG aired various formats, but usually was MOR. In December 1979 Doc Benson closed WIDG with a "dark" license until April 12, 1981. He had to bring WIDG-AM back on in order to continue the CP for WIDG-FM. Initially the station was to be WIDG-FM and be automated and be called "Big Country-102 FM." TM Programming was hired to consult the station; they felt that the "Big Country" name was too "hickish" and insisted on something "slicker." General Manager Rick Stone held a "name the FM" contest in which the winner would win a Big Mac sandwich from McDonald's. Joe Raica came up with WMKC, for "MacKinaC", the county of license. The station went on the air in February 1982 with Steve Cook as morning host, Chuck LaTour as News Director, Greg Salo mid-days, Tim O'Brien (Ahlborn) (also Program Director and assistant manager - later General Manager several times) afternoons and Joe Raica evenings.

=== WMKC in the 1980s ===
When WMKC signed on, they were known as "103-WMKC", playing an automated country format (TM Country). Mornings were live with the rest of the day voicetracked. Legend has it that Benson, although a huge country fan, hated songs that dealt with immoral issues. It has been reported, for example, that Benson would order his staff to edit "Dueling Banjos" by Eric Weissberg and Steve Mandell out of the TM reels with a razor blade and a marker because of the song's association with a movie (1972's Deliverance) featuring sodomy; however, the staffers sometimes reportedly slipped the song in anyway just for laughs.

In 1985, the station's logo changed to "KC-103." Doc attempted to capitalize on his love for WITL and tried to get the staff to say "KCing while you work" since WITL said "Witl ["Whittle", like "Whistle"] while you work The "KC-ing while you work" was never used on the air unless done sarcastically."

In 1987 the station dropped voice-tracking and added live announcers, but still used reel-to-reel music (TM had become TM-Century, then bought Drake-Chenault, so a variety of program consultants and services were used). WIDG changed to WLVM "We Love Michigan" and TM Programming's TM-OR middle of the road and nostalgia format. In 1985, the format, which Doc Benson reportedly hated, was dropped, and WIDG calls returned.

In 1985 Doc obtained the CP (Construction Permit) for a new FM in Cadillac at 107.1 Cadillac, MI. Cadillac previously had a WITW and Doc reportedly believed he could capitalize on the "good will" of the other station's calls and came up with WYTW. It was called Y-107 and ran satellite adult contemporary music for a short period, but the station was unable to make enough money to pay its expenses. In 1989 WYTW changed to WCKC ("Cadillac KC Country") and simulcast with WMKC and WIDG (which he wouldn't allow to be changed to WMKC-AM).

=== The 1990s to today ===
In 1990 a new tower location for WMKC was obtained, moving the stick from Saint Ignace to north of Harbor Springs. The new signal covered much more territory, but lost Sault Ste. Marie (hence the later purchase by Northern Star of WMKD), and because of the new counties added, lost ABC News and Paul Harvey from the station.

In 1996, Benson retired, selling WMKC, alongside WCKC and WIDG, to Straits area broadcast legend Del Reynolds. He would maintain KC Country, although he would change the Cadillac station to a simulcast of his classic rock station, WGFM/WGFN. Benson died on May 27, 2005.

In 1998, Reynolds sold his assets to Calibre Communications, which had big plans for their newly acquired stations. WGFN became The Bear, retaining their classic rock format but adding Bob and Tom for mornings, smooth jazz WJZJ became The Zone, playing watered-down automated alternative rock, and KC Country gave way to K-Garth, stunting with all Garth Brooks music.

Shortly after the K-Garth stunt, 102.9 brought back its regular country format, only as Big Country 102.9. The station's airstaff was canned, only allowing for one DJ, a morning man. Eventually, WMKC brought back a full-time airstaff, though mornings (Young & Verna) and nights (Lia) are syndicated.

The KC Country name did live on for a while as WIDG flipped from satellite-fed oldies "Cool 940" to satellite-fed classic country as "Classic KC Country". After just over one year, the station flipped to Sporting News Radio (formerly One-on-One Sports) as "The Fan".

In 1998, the sale between Calibre and Reynolds failed, and a new company, Northern Star, was formed to take over the stations.

In early 2008, WMKC changed its city of license from St. Ignace to the small Cheboygan County community of Indian River. Some have suggested that an Upper Peninsula city of license made the station unpalatable to listeners and advertisers in the northern Lower Peninsula, and that the change in city of license takes WMKC one step closer to being a "Traverse City" station. WIDG-AM remains licensed to St. Ignace but is no longer co-owned, now airing Catholic programming.

WMKC has also recently reimaged itself as "102.9 Big Country Hits," a reference to sister station WLJZ 94.5 FM's format change to classic country as "Big Country Gold." "Big Country Gold" programming is now heard on WCBY 1240 AM, while WLJZ (now WSBX) now plays classic rock.

== WAVC ==
From 2001 to April 2010, WMKC programming was also simulcast on WAVC 93.9 FM licensed to Mio, Michigan. That station is now a simulcast of classic-rock formatted sister station WGFN 98.1 FM ("The Bear"), leaving WMKC as the sole "Big Country" outlet.
