= WCMV =

WCMV may refer to:

- WCMV (TV), a television station (channel 34, virtual 27) licensed to serve Cadillac, Michigan, United States
- WCMV-FM, a radio station (94.3 FM) licensed to serve Leland, Michigan
