= WGJU =

Coordinates: 44°16′25″N 83°39′48″W

- East Tawas, Michigan; United States
- Broadcast area: Tawas Bay region
- Frequency: 91.3 MHz
- Branding: Relevant Radio

Programming
- Format: Catholic talk
- Affiliations: Relevant Radio

Ownership
- Owner: Relevant Radio, Inc.

History
- First air date: September 6, 2005
- Former call signs: WZHN (2005–2008); WRQC (2008–2011)

Technical information
- Licensing authority: FCC
- Facility ID: 90268
- Class: C3
- ERP: 20,000 watts
- HAAT: 269 ft. (82 meters)

Links
- Public license information: Public file; LMS
- Webcast: Listen Live
- Website: www.relevantradio.com

WGJU (91.3 FM) is a radio station broadcasting a Catholic Christian radio station in East Tawas, Michigan serving the East Tawas and Iosco County area of Michigan's Tawas Bay region. It is a repeater of originating station of WTCY 88.3 FM licensed to Greilickville, Michigan with studio and office formerly located at Indian River near the Cross in the Woods outdoor Catholic shrine which moved to new facilities at its new base in Traverse City in the spring of 2015. The station currently airs programming from Catholic radio network Relevant Radio.

Former owner Baraga Broadcasting's namesake is Frederic Baraga, a missionary to Native American tribes and later the first Bishop of the Sault Sainte Marie Catholic diocese, which is now the Diocese of Marquette.

== Brief history ==
WGJU had its beginnings as WZHN, a simulcast of WPHN owned by Northern Christian Radio in Gaylord. In 2008 WZHN became WRQC airing Contemporary Christian music as "91.3 The Rock." WRQC briefly went silent in January 2011 returning to the air as WGJU. Originally Baraga Broadcasting obtained a construction permit for the 88.9 frequency in Tawas City but instead purchased WRQC, hence the construction permit for 88.9 was dropped.

Baraga Broadcasting acquired the former WRQC in July 2012.

On December 11, 2019, WGJU and its sister stations were acquired by Immaculate Heart Media, bringing Relevant Radio programming to Northern Michigan.

== See also ==
- WTCY (originating station)
- WTCK
- WIDG
- WGZR
- WMQU
- Frederik Baraga
