= WTCY =

Coordinates: 44°57′59″N 85°46′28″W

- Greilickville, Michigan; United States
- Broadcast area: Traverse City, Michigan
- Frequency: 88.3 MHz
- Branding: Relevant Radio

Programming
- Format: Catholic talk
- Affiliations: Relevant Radio

Ownership
- Owner: Relevant Radio, Inc.

History
- Call sign meaning: Traverse City

Technical information
- Licensing authority: FCC
- Facility ID: 171772
- Class: C3
- ERP: 4,400 watts vertical polarization only
- HAAT: 679 feet (207 meters)

Links
- Public license information: Public file; LMS
- Webcast: Listen Live
- Website: www.relevantradio.com

WTCY (88.3 FM) is a Catholic radio station licensed to Greilickville, Michigan serving the Traverse City area of the northwestern region of Michigan's lower peninsula. It began as an FM repeater of WTCK 90.9 FM in Charlevoix with main studios located near the Cross in the Woods Catholic Shrine in Indian River. In the spring of 2015, the main studio moved from its Indian River beginnings to a new facility in Traverse City.

== Brief history ==
WTCY began in July 2010 as a construction permit issued to the Grand Traverse Area Catholic Schools which was sold in November of that year to Baraga Broadcasting. By 2011 the construction permit was modified and the power upgraded from that of the original construction permit. Its licence was granted by the FCC in May 2011.

In the fall of 2014 a new logo and branding "Baraga Radio" was introduced along with a new website The Catholic Light Dot Com coupled with its 2015 move of its main studio from Indian River to Traverse City.

WTCK (licensed to Charlevoix) is now a repeater station with its former main studio in Indian River.

On December 11, 2019, WTCY and its sister stations were acquired by Immaculate Heart Media, bringing Relevant Radio programming to Northern Michigan.

== Callsign history ==
WTCY were the call letters of 1390 AM (originally WOHP, later WTOO and currently WBLL in Bellefontaine, Ohio from 1981 until 1983). It was also used between 1993 and 2008 on 1400 AM in Harrisburg Pennsylvania which is now WHGB.

== Repeaters of WTCY ==
- WIDG 940 AM in St. Ignace
- WTCK 90.9 FM in Charlevoix serving Indian River with translator W221CA at 92.1 FM in Gaylord.
- WGZR 88.1 FM in Alpena
- WGJU 91.3 FM in East Tawas

== Affiliate ==
- WMQU 1230 AM in Grayling
