= WDEE-FM =

Radio station in Michigan

Coordinates: 43.781°N 85.616°W

- Reed City, Michigan; United States
- Broadcast area: Big Rapids, Michigan
- Frequency: 97.3 MHz
- Branding: Sunny 97.3

Programming
- Format: Oldies

Ownership
- Owner: Steven Beilfuss

History
- First air date: August 1997

Technical information
- Licensing authority: FCC
- Facility ID: 63424
- Class: A
- ERP: 2,850 watts
- HAAT: 146 meters

Links
- Public license information: Public file; LMS

WDEE-FM (97.3 FM, "Sunny 97.3") is a radio station licensed to Reed City, Michigan, with studios in Big Rapids. The station plays the Classic Hits from 1955 through 2006.

== History ==
=== Beginnings as WDEE ===
WDEE originally began as an AM station broadcasting on 1500 kHz, first going on the air in 1981, and under the ownership of David A. Carmine, a well-known country music radio personality from Detroit known by his on-air name of Dave Carr. Carmine had moved to Harrison, Michigan, in 1973 to put his first station on the air in 1975, known then as WKKM. WDEE first broadcast with its own independent staff and programming originating from downtown Reed City at 410 W. Upton Avenue. By the end of the decade, WDEE was reduced to a simulcast outlet of WKKM in Harrison before finally being silenced in October 1992.

Prior to this version of WDEE, the WDEE call sign was used on a well known 50,000–watt AM station in Detroit, Michigan, on the same frequency of 1500 kHz (now known as WLQV). WDEE in Detroit was one of the first radio stations to program a country music format using top 40 methods and was very popular. Like the original WDEE, Reed City's WDEE was a country station.

From 1960 to 1967 the call letters WDEE were assigned to a daytime AM station in Hamden, Connecticut broadcasting on frequency 1220.

=== Sale to current owner ===
In January 1994, WDEE was sold to Steven V. Beilfuss known to northwestern Michigan listeners as Steve Masters and best known for his tenure at 100,000 watt stations WLDR-FM in Traverse City and WKJF-FM in Cadillac. Beilfuss put the station back on the air in 1994 with an Oldies format. Studios and offices were established at 207 1/2 W. Upton Avenue in Reed City, not far from the original location.

=== Birth of WDEE-FM ===
Originally a weak daytime-only AM signal of 250 watts, ownership then successfully applied for an FM license for 97.3 MHz, which made its debut as WDEE-FM as a full simulcast of its AM sister-station. At that time, the station was known as "Classic Hits 97.3." At around this same time, studios and offices were relocated to 101 S. Higbee Street in Reed City.

Eventually, programming was separated between the two stations, with a classic country format on WDEE. After ownership chose not to renew WDEE's license, WDEE-FM was left as the only license owned by Beilfuss Broadcasting and continues to broadcast today.

Shortly after the turn of the 21st Century, WDEE-FM re-located its studios from Reed City into downtown Big Rapids. Their studios are currently located at 120 North Michigan Ave, Suite 4 in the plaza along with Family Dollar and the Michigan Secretary of State's office.

== Sources ==
- Michiguide.com - WDEE-FM History
