= WBZX =

Coordinates: 43°39′44″N 85°20′00″W

- Big Rapids, Michigan; United States
- Broadcast area: Big Rapids, Michigan; Cadillac, Michigan; Mount Pleasant, Michigan
- Frequency: 103.9 MHz
- Branding: B103.9

Programming
- Format: Classic hits

Ownership
- Owner: Up North Radio, LLC
- Sister stations: WCDY, WCKC

History
- First air date: August 24, 2016

Technical information
- Licensing authority: FCC
- Facility ID: 191528
- Class: A
- Power: 6,000 watts
- HAAT: 70 meters (230 ft)

Links
- Public license information: Public file; LMS
- Website: b1039bigrapids.com

WBZX (103.9 FM) is a radio station in Big Rapids, Michigan. Owned by Up North Radio, LLC, the station broadcasts a classic hits format branded as B103.9.

The station first broadcast on August 24, 2016, stunting with a beautiful music format as "Beautiful 104" until its official launch on August 27, 2016. The station is owned by Up North Radio, who also owns and operates WCKC, Cadillac, and WCDY, McBain-Cadillac.
