= WGFE =

Satellite of WGFM, Cheboygan
- Glen Arbor, Michigan; United States
- Broadcast area: Traverse City, Michigan
- Frequency: 95.5 MHz
- Branding: Rock 105 & 95.5

Programming
- Language: English
- Format: Active rock

Ownership
- Owner: Black Diamond Broadcasting
- Sister stations: WCBY, WCHY, WGFM, WGFN, WMKC, WTWS, WUPS

History
- First air date: 1997 (as WJZJ)
- Former call signs: WTHM (1989–1992); DWTHM (1992–1995); WTHM (1995–1997); WJZJ (1997–2013); WQEZ (2013–2017)

Technical information
- Licensing authority: FCC
- Facility ID: 15631
- Class: C2
- ERP: 21,000 watts
- HAAT: 225 meters (738 ft)
- Transmitter coordinates: 44°49′16″N 85°59′47″W

Links
- Public license information: Public file; LMS
- Webcast: Listen Live
- Website: rock105.fm

WGFE (95.5 FM) is a radio station licensed to serve the community of Glen Arbor, Michigan. The station is owned by Black Diamond Broadcasting. The station airs an active rock format, simulcasting 105.1 WGFM in Cheboygan, Michigan.

== History ==
In 1989, David C. Schaberg applied for a construction permit on 95.5 FM in Glen Arbor, and the station was known as WTHM. Schaberg sold the permit to Del Reynolds in 1997, where he changed the call letters to WJZJ. In 1997, the station was put on the air as a simulcast of WLJZ 94.5 in Mackinaw City, Michigan, which played a satellite-delivered smooth jazz format as "Coast FM". WJZJ, along with WAVC 93.9 in Mio and WLJZ, launched "The Zone", a modern rock station in March 1998, replacing Coast FM after having been sold from Del Reynolds to Calibre Communications.

The Zone was originally adult-leaning, whose core artists included Jewel, Paula Cole, Alanis Morissette, Barenaked Ladies, Sheryl Crow, and Goo Goo Dolls. In its early years, The Zone could be more accurately described as a Modern Adult Contemporary station, and the station, which positioned itself as "Modern Rock" even while it continued to play primarily adult alternative and Hot AC crossover material, received criticism from fans of harder rock for not including harder-edged artists such as KoRn and Limp Bizkit, whose music was rarely played on classic rock-leaning rival WKLT. It was not until 2000 that "The Zone" became a true "modern rock" radio station. The Zone's revamped "modern rock" format borrowed from both "alternative" and "active" rock formats.

After the format change, ratings improved dramatically, but once again soon fell, partially due to a translator station launched on 95.5 in Boyne City, Michigan, only slightly outside 95.5 Glen Arbor's protected signal contour. The Boyne City station relayed Classic Hits-formatted competitor "The Fox" (WFCX-FM 94.3/WFDX-FM 92.5). However, the "Fox" translator moved down to 95.3 FM in December 2006 (and has since moved to 100.5 FM), alleviating some of the interference to WJZJ in its northern fringe coverage.

WAVC dropped out of The Zone's simulcast in March 2001, choosing to simulcast the country station WMKC (102.9 FM, St. Ignace, "Big Country 102.9 & 93.9"). It now airs a Christian format, as an affiliate of Strong Tower Radio.

On June 5, 2006, the station became an affiliate of Waitt Radio Networks' now-defunct "Alternative Now" format. As a result, the only live and local program the station carried was its morning show, "The Morning Freakshow" hosted by Cartman, Homeless Jake, and Mizz Christal.

On June 26, WJZJ became the sole carrier of The Zone as WLJZ broke the simulcast to switch to Hot AC. On December 28, 2007, the station began broadcasting out of their Traverse City, Michigan studios.

On September 14, 2009, the station began carrying The Free Beer and Hot Wings Show. It was also on that day when they started simulcasting with WGFM 105.1 Cheboygan as "Real Rock 105.1/95.5", airing a mix of The Zone's harder rock artists such as KoRn, Metallica and Alice in Chains with harder classic rockers such as Aerosmith, Ozzy Osbourne and Van Halen. 105.1 carried Bob and Tom due to the duo's ratings in the upper northern Michigan region until August 2, 2010, when The Free Beer And Hot Wings Show replaced it on 105.1 as well.

On March 25, 2013, the station announced that they had canceled Free Beer and Hot Wings. Station staff claimed that a satellite issue caused them to cancel the show earlier than expected as the station announced that they were making changes. The station's listeners took to Facebook with their complaints and staffers had been responding that it was management's decision to move on and not theirs. The morning show had a huge following in northern Michigan, even doing their show live from the historic State Theatre in Traverse City to a sold-out crowd. This led to speculation that Real Rock would be changing format; around Christmas 2012, the station was playing an abundance of classic rock artists not normally heard on the station, such as Styx, Jefferson Starship and Boston. However, by early March, the station had reverted to a more-modern rock format, but current rock tracks had disappeared from the station. The format change rumors came to fruition on April 1, 2013, with WJZJ's change to WQEZ and 105.1 FM continuing a standalone mainstream rock format as "Rock 105."

As WQEZ, the station broadcast a soft adult contemporary format (similar to that of WDUV in Tampa, Florida, or WFEZ in Miami, Florida) to northwestern lower Michigan. The station was branded "Easy 95-5". Typical artists included Barbra Streisand, Barry Manilow, Elvis Presley, The Carpenters, Olivia Newton-John, Elton John, Celine Dion, and Kenny Rogers among others, with a small scattering of more contemporary AC hits from artists like Adele, Colbie Caillat, and Lady Antebellum. The same format, with separate imaging, was heard on WOEZ 106.3 FM, licensed to Onaway, Michigan, imaged as "Easy 106-3." WQEZ's signal serves primarily the immediate Traverse City area and carries across the waters of Lake Michigan, and can frequently be heard in Manitowoc, Wisconsin and the eastern shoreline of Door County, Wisconsin. 106.3 WOEZ's signal covers the northern tip of the lower peninsula and much of eastern Upper Michigan. The two stations aired the same musical format with the same songs in the same order (with a slight delay), but were not simulcast, as station imaging, commercials, and weather forecasts are separate. ABC Entertainment Network news is featured at the top of each hour. WOEZ was also heard on translator 98.1 W251AD in Alpena.
