= WGZR =

Coordinates: 44°51′25″N 83°32′34.1″W

- Alpena, Michigan; United States
- Broadcast area: Alpena and surrounding area
- Frequency: 88.9 MHz
- Branding: Relevant Radio

Programming
- Format: Catholic talk
- Affiliations: Relevant Radio

Ownership
- Owner: Relevant Radio, Inc.

History
- First air date: July 2012

Technical information
- Licensing authority: FCC
- Facility ID: 171725
- Class: C3
- ERP: 1,500 watts
- HAAT: 328 ft (100 m)

Links
- Public license information: Public file; LMS
- Webcast: Listen Live
- Website: www.relevantradio.com

WGZR (88.9 FM) is a non-commercial religious radio station in Alpena, Michigan, airing Catholic talk programming from Relevant Radio. WGZR can also be heard on FM translator W221CA at 92.1 MHz in Gaylord.

The station was formerly owned by Baraga Broadcasting, which was named after Frederik Baraga, a missionary to several Indian tribes in northern Michigan and later the first Bishop of the Sault Ste. Marie Catholic Diocese which is now the Diocese of Marquette. The station also formerly aired programming from EWTN Global Catholic Radio in addition to Ave Maria Radio (based at WDEO in Ypsilanti).

WGZR is an FM repeater of WTCY 88.3 FM licensed to Greilickville serving the Traverse City area from its new studio and offices also located in Traverse City. Some local programs also originate from the WGJU satellite studio located at Holy Family School in East Tawas.

== Brief history ==
WGZR began as a construction permit granted by the FCC on July 24, 2009, to the All Saints School in Alpena. The construction permit and subsequent license was then sold to Baraga Broadcasting in October 2011.

On December 11, 2019, WGZR and its sister stations were acquired by Immaculate Heart Media, bringing Relevant Radio programming to Northern Michigan.

== Callsign history ==
WGZR was also the callsign used from 2003 to 2011 at 106.9 FM (now WUBB) in Bluffton, South Carolina.

== See also ==
- WTCY (originating station)
- WIDG
- WTCK
- WGJU
- WMQU
