= WWMK =

- Onaway, Michigan; United States
- Broadcast area: Cheboygan, Michigan
- Frequency: 106.3 MHz
- Branding: 106.3 Mac-FM

Programming
- Format: Classic Soft rock

Ownership
- Owner: Black Diamond Broadcast Holdings, LLC.
- Sister stations: WCBY, WCHY, WGFE, WGFM, WGFN, WMKC, WTWS, WUPS

History
- First air date: 2012 (as WYPV)
- Former call signs: WYPV (8/16/2011-5/10/2013); WJZJ (5/10/2013-5/30/2013); WOEZ (5/30/2013-3/24/2017); WQEZ (3/24/2017-10/28/2017)
- Call sign meaning: MK = "Mac"

Technical information
- Licensing authority: FCC
- Facility ID: 189540
- Class: C2
- ERP: 31,000 watts
- HAAT: 191 meters
- Transmitter coordinates: 45°39′01″N 84°20′37″W
- Translator: 98.1 W251AD (Alpena)

Links
- Public license information: Public file; LMS
- Webcast: Listen Live
- Website: 1063macfm.com

WWMK (106.3 FM) is a soft adult contemporary radio station that is licensed to Onaway, Michigan, and serving the greater Straits of Mackinac area of Northern Michigan and the Eastern Upper Peninsula. The station is owned by Black Diamond Broadcast Group, L.L.C. and broadcasts from studios on US-23 in Cheboygan.

The station is branded as Smooth Sailing 106.3 Mac-FM and features a fully automated playlist of music often refereed to as "Yacht rock". The station is an affiliate of ABC News, with local news and weather reports. WWMK also broadcasts St. Ignace Area Schools sports.

Programming is simulcast on FM Translator W251AD, licensed to Alpena, Michigan at 98.1 MHz.

== History ==
The station began broadcasting in 2012, holding the call sign WYPV, and originally aired a talk format, branded "Your Patriot Voice". In May 2013, the station's call sign was changed to WJZJ, and the WYPV calls and talk format moved to 94.5 FM in Mackinaw City, Michigan, which had been home to "The Bear" simulcast.

Later that month, the station's call sign was changed to WOEZ. The station would air a soft adult contemporary format (similar to that of WDUV in Tampa, Florida, or WFEZ in Miami, Florida) to northwestern lower Michigan. The station was branded "Easy 106-3". Typical artists included Barbra Streisand, Barry Manilow, Elvis Presley, The Carpenters, Olivia Newton-John, Elton John, Celine Dion, and Kenny Rogers among others, with a small scattering of more contemporary AC hits from artists like Adele, Colbie Caillat, and Lady Antebellum. This format was also heard on WQEZ 95.5 FM of Glen Arbor, Michigan from 2013 until 2017, who separately imaged as "Easy 95.5". The two stations aired the same musical format with the same songs in the same order (with a slight delay), but were not simulcast, as station imaging, commercials, and weather forecasts were separate. 95.5 is now known as WGFE, simulcasting sister station WGFM 105.1.

On March 17, 2017, the Easy format ended on 95.5 FM, as WQEZ would become a simulcast of sister station WGFM as WGFE. This left WOEZ as the standalone "Easy" outlet. On March 24, 2017, the WQEZ call letters moved to 106.3, who got rid of their former WOEZ callsign.

On October 30, 2017, WQEZ changed their format from soft AC (as "Easy 106.3") to classic hits, branded as "106.3 Mac FM" under new WWMK calls (which it assumed on October 28). The Mac refers to Big Mack, the Mackinac Bridge. Around this same time, WWMK became the new Northern Michigan affiliate for The Bob & Tom Show, after sister classic rock stations WGFN & WCHY dropped it in favor of the locally-hosted Omelette & Coates program.

In January 2019, WWMK tweaked its format to a modified classic hits mix dubbed "Smooth Sailing," a 1970s and 80s gold-based soft adult contemporary format.
