= Wolverine Hotel (Boyne City, Michigan) =

- U.S. National Register of Historic Places
- Michigan State Historic Site
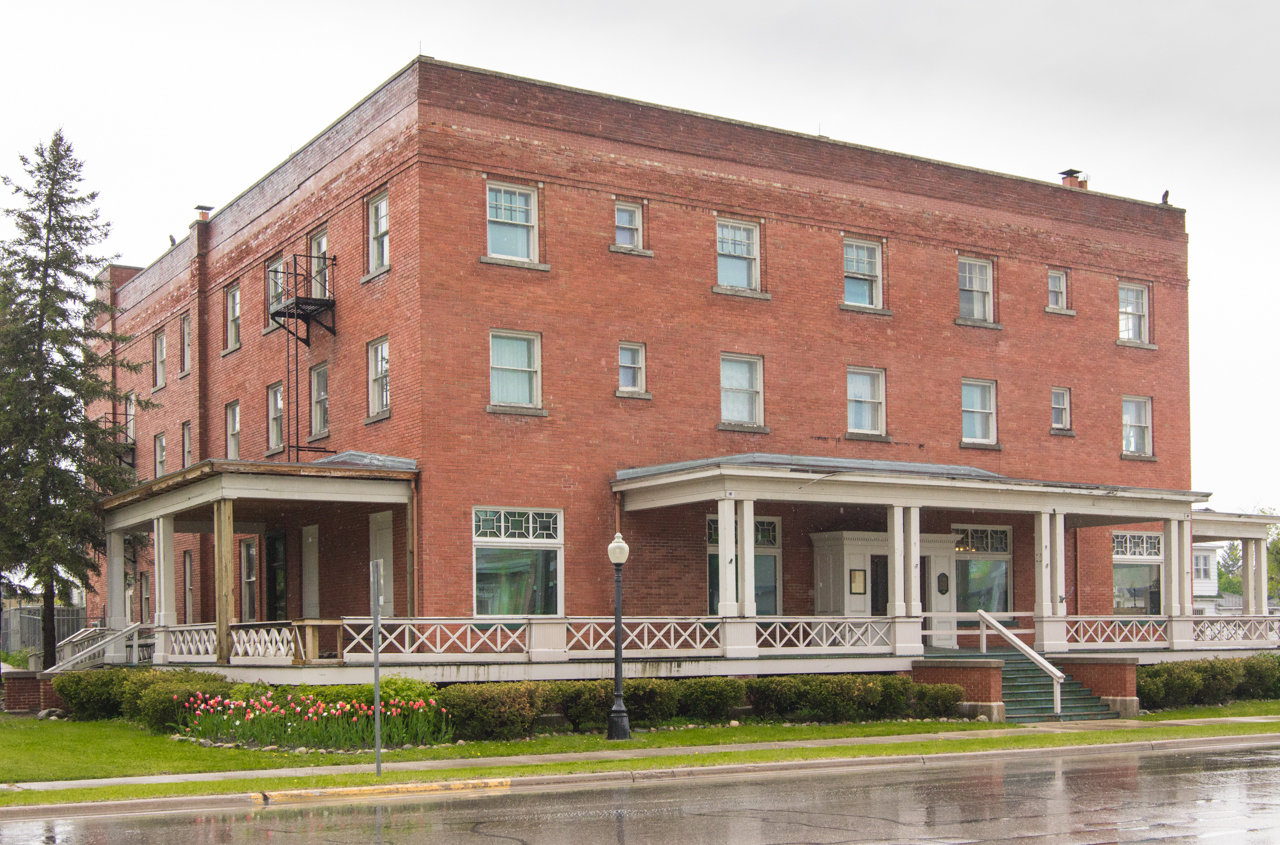

- Location within Michigan Location within the United States
- Interactive map
- Location: 300 Water St., Boyne City, Michigan
- Coordinates: 45°12′54″N 85°0′58″W
- Area: 0.8 acres (0.32 ha)
- Built: 1911
- Built by: Price Bros.
- Architectural style: Classical Revival
- NRHP reference No.: 86000261
- Added to NRHP: February 13, 1986

The Wolverine Hotel, also known as the Dilworth Hotel or the Wolverine-Dilworth Inn, is a hotel located at 300 Water Street in Boyne City, Michigan. It was listed on the National Register of Historic Places in 1986. It is the only hotel remaining in the Boyne area dating from the turn-of-the-century era when Boyne City was a booming lumber town.

== History ==
At the turn of the 19th century, Boyne City was the lumber capital of northwest Michigan. Related businesses opened their doors in Boyne City, employing more and more men. As the new century progressed, the city grew rapidly, from 912 residents in 1900 to 5,995 residents in 1910. In 1911, a group of Boyne City residents felt the city needed a high-class hotel, a notch above the half-dozen hotels already established in the city. Forty-six residents formed the Boyne City Hotel Company, and commissioned a building to be called the Wolverine Hotel. They hired Price Brothers from East Jordan, Michigan to construct the building. The hotel opened on February 1, 1912.

However, by the end of World War I, the timber in the area had been depleted. Businesses around Boyne City closed and residents moved. In 1936, the hotel was purchased by Wesley Dilworth, who renamed it the Dilworth Hotel. During the 1930s and 1940s, the Dilworth became known nationally for hosting the annual Boyne City Smelt Run Banquet. Dilworth sold the hotel in the mid-1940s.

The hotel changed hands multiple times, and by the 2000s was struggling. It closed in 2008. The building was purchased by an investor in 2013, with plans to rehabilitate the building. The project received a $1,000,000 grant in 2015, and when completed will have 26 hotel rooms, a restaurant, a banquet room and a pub.

== Description ==
The Wolverine Hotel Hotel is a four-story Classical Revival brick structure with a flat roof. The lower two floors are rectangular in plan, measuring 76 by 96 feet (23 by 29 m). The upper two floors are U-shaped. The ground floor is approximately half below grade, with the main floor above about four feet (1.2 m) above grade. The walls are constructed of red/orange brick. Small white concrete blocks ornament the third-story windows. A sheet metal cornice runs around the building above the fourth-floor windows, and a parapet wall extends above that.

The hotel has three porches with square Doric columns on the north, east, and west elevations. These porches are reproductions of the original porches, which were removed at some time in the past.

On the interior, the lobby has Classic Revival pilasters projecting from the walls, and a beamed, coffered ceiling with ornamental plaster moldings. The wood is dark stained oak, and the floor is porcelain tile. This tile extends down the hallway to the main dining room, which has similar pilasters and coffered ceiling. The dining room also has glass chandeliers and a large fireplace. Another bar/dining room is located in the corner of the building, with the kitchen opposite. A frame addition to the building extends the kitchen space to accommodate freezers and coolers.
