= WCBY =

Coordinates: 45°39′30″N 84°29′24″W

- Cheboygan, Michigan; United States
- Broadcast area
- Frequency: 1240 kHz
- Branding: Big Country Gold

Programming
- Format: Classic Country
- Affiliations: Detroit Tigers; Detroit Red Wings

Ownership
- Owner: Black Diamond Broadcast Holdings, LLC.
- Sister stations: WCHY, WGFE, WGFM, WGFN, WWMK, WMKC, WTWS, WUPS

History
- First air date: October 1954
- Call sign meaning: CheBoYgan

Technical information
- Licensing authority: FCC
- Facility ID: 56074
- Class: C
- Power: 1,000 watts
- Translators: 98.1 W251CW (Indian River); 100.7 W264CF (St. Ignace)

Links
- Public license information: Public file; LMS
- Webcast: Listen Live
- Website: bigcountrygold.com

WCBY (1240 AM) is a classic country radio station that is licensed to Cheboygan, Michigan, and serving the greater Straits of Mackinac area of Northern Michigan and the Eastern Upper Peninsula. The station is owned by Black Diamond Broadcast Group, L.L.C. and broadcasts from studios on US-23 in Cheboygan.

The station is branded as Big Country Gold, and features a local morning show hosted by Mike Grisdale. The station is an affiliate of the Detroit Tigers and Detroit Red Wings radio networks. WCBY also broadcasts Cheboygan High School sports.

Programming is simulcast on FM Translator W264CF, licensed to St. Ignace at 100.7 MHz and W251CW, licensed to Indian River at 98.1 MHz.

== History ==
The station began broadcasting in 1954 as a 250-watt station under the ownership of Straits Broadcasting. For over a quarter-century the station featured a full-service format featuring popular music which was chiefly MOR in nature but included some Top 40 fare to appeal to younger listeners after school hours. An FM sister, 25,000-watt WCBY-FM at 105.1, was added in 1968 and aired a beautiful music format.

WCBY-AM/FM were sold in 1981 to Fabiano-Strickler Communications, which implemented format changes at both AM and FM, changing the AM to country music and the FM to Top 40, eventually changing the FM's call letters to WQLZ and boosting its power to 100,000 watts. In 1989, WGFM and WQLZ came under the ownership of Del Reynolds, who had begun his broadcasting career at WCBY in the 1960s, and his wife Mary. WCBY-AM adopted an MOR/adult standards format which continued for over two decades, and WQLZ became WGFM with a classic rock format as "W-Gold FM", later changing to "The Bear" and most recently to "Real Rock 105 & 95-5" (simulcast with WJZJ-FM Traverse City). At various times WCBY featured programming from the Music of Your Life network and from Waitt Radio Networks' "The Lounge" format.

In April 2010, WCBY dropped standards in favor of the classic country format formerly heard on FM sister station 94.5 FM.

In October 2012, WCBY added a presence on the FM dial with translator 100.7 W264CF Saint Ignace. In the early days of WCBY, the station had a studio in St. Ignace but closed that studio when Mighty-Mac Broadcasting Company's WIDG signed on the air.

In February 2015, WCBY became an affiliate of CBS Radio airing hourly national news, complemented by local news, sports, and community information.

WCBY airs Cheboygan Chief basketball and football games as well as Detroit Tigers Baseball and Detroit Red Wings Hockey games.

WCBY streams on line at www.bigcountrygold.com
