= Boyne City Water Works Building =

- U.S. National Register of Historic Places
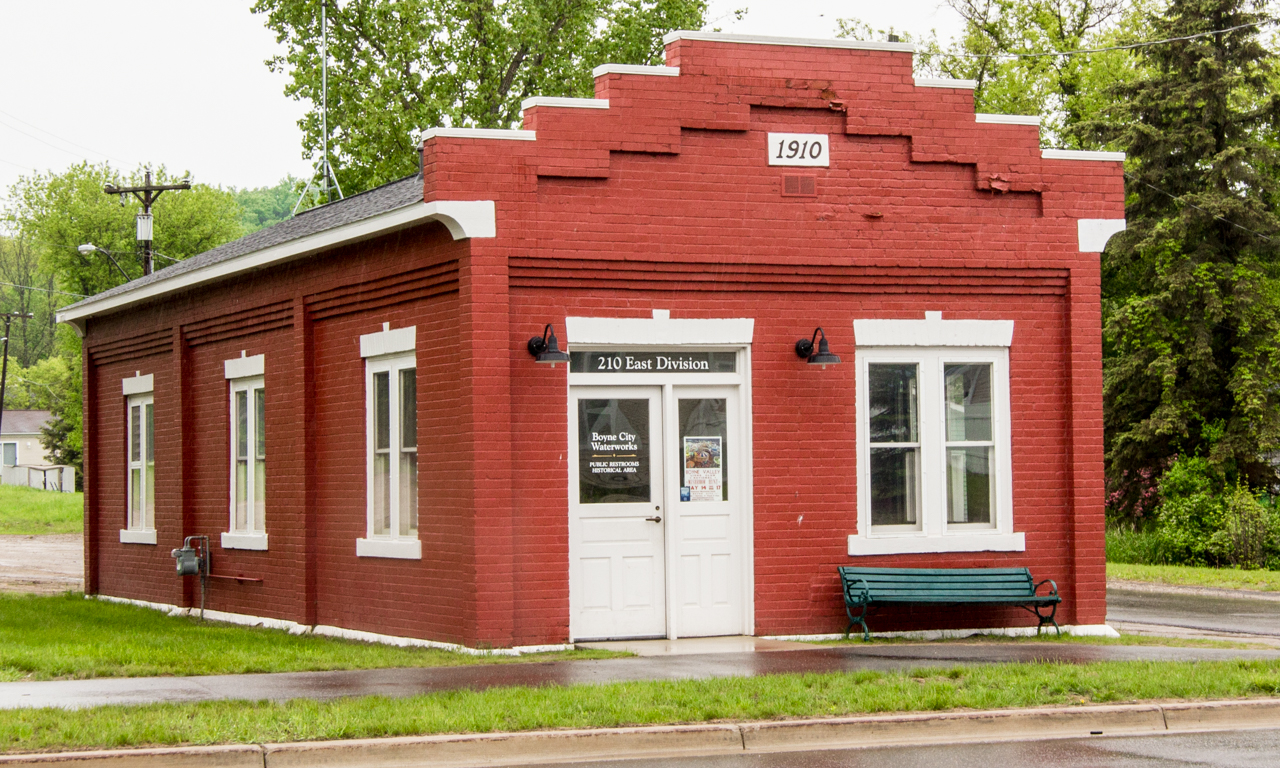

- Location within Michigan Location within the United States
- Interactive map
- Location: 210 E. Division St., Boyne City, Michigan
- Coordinates: 45°12′17″N 85°0′49″W
- Area: less than one acre
- Built: 1910
- Built by: Bill Jentzen
- Architectural style: Early Commercial
- NRHP reference No.: 98001060
- Added to NRHP: August 14, 1998

The Boyne City Water Works Building is a municipal industrial building located at 210 East Division Street in Boyne City, Michigan. It was listed in the National Register of Historic Places in 1998.

== History ==
During the lumber boom of the early 1900s, Boyne City's population growth soared, rising from 912 in 1900 to 5995 in 1910, plus an estimated 3000 transient lumber workers. The expansion rendered the city's water system obsolete, and in early 1910 the city council directed the city's board of public works to estimate "the expense of constructing and extending the water works system." In April voters approved a bond to do so. Plans were drawn up to construct a 500,000 gallon reservoir and an associated pumping station. The Manufacturing & Supply Co. was hired to construct the water works building for $1075.00 in September 1910; they subcontracted the work to local contractor Bill Jentzen. It is likely the building was completed before the end of the year.

The water works building served the Boyne City populace from 1910 until 1988, when a new pump building replaced it. The building remained vacant and unused until 2010, when it was slated for demolition. A group of local citizens convinced the city to restore the building. It was returned to operation as a city water system booster station, and public restrooms were installed. The building was reopened in July 2011.

== Description ==
The Boyne City Water Works Building is a single-story rectangular brick gable-roof structure measuring twenty feet in width by fifty feet in length. It sits on a concrete foundation. Buttress piers project slightly at the corners, and divide the side walls into three sections. Corbelled brickwork runs between the upper ends of the piers. The front gable contains a low stepped parapet and a recessed central panel with the date of construction. The windows are paired, double-hung, four-over-four units in square head openings. Each end of the building has a window and door pair.
