= WKKM-LP =

WKKM
- Harrison, Michigan; United States
- Frequency: 106.5 MHz

Programming
- Format: Christian radio

Ownership
- Owner: Hope Baptist Church of Harrison

History
- First air date: September 18, 2014
- Call sign meaning: Heritage call sign in Harrison, previously used by 92.1 FM and 1540 AM. Now, King of Kings Media

Technical information
- Facility ID: 193246
- ERP: 83 watts
- HAAT: 32.905 meters
- Transmitter coordinates: 44°1′2.07″N 84°47′56.07″W

WKKM-LP is an American low-power FM radio station, licensed to the city of Harrison, Michigan. The station operates on a frequency of 106.5 MHz with an effective radiated power of 83 watts. The station is owned by Hope Baptist Church of Harrison; studios, offices and transmitter facilities are at 209 East Spruce Street in Harrison.

== History ==
WKKM's origins in Harrison date back to 1973, when Detroit radio personality and engineer David Allan Carmine (best known professionally as Dave Carr) moved from Detroit to Harrison to start a radio station there. Harrison did not have a local radio station on the air serving the immediate area, so Carmine applied for the frequency of 92.1. Carmine signed on the air with a country format, billing it as "The Country King" and "The Mighty 92" and kept it under this format until he sold the station in 2002, choosing to retire. That station, known today as WTWS, was later re-licensed to Houghton Lake, Michigan, and its new sister station, WUPS, was re-licensed to Harrison, though it has no physical presence there.

In 2002, Carmine formed "The Country King, Incorporated" as a non-profit entity, with the intent of starting a non-commercial educational station in Harrison.

The WKKM call letters then bounced around to a non-commercial station in Imlay City after the sale, then Alpena and finally back to Harrison, where they resurfaced at 90.7 MHz, known today as WBHL, part of the Strong Tower Radio network. From 2008 to 2011, that station was licensed to "The Country King, Incorporated", also owned by Carmine. It, too, boasted the country music format that its predecessor in 1975 pioneered. In 2011, that station was sold and its power increased to 10,000 watts.

The last incarnation of WKKM on this frequency first went on the air September 18, 2014, under the licensee "The Country King, Incorporated", and was owned by Carmine. The station did not have a social media page or website. The license was applied for in October 2013 and granted by the FCC in January 2014. Carmine continued to operate this station until his death on August 8, 2025.

In May 2024, Hope Baptist Church of Harrison purchased the station from Country King, Incorporated.
