= WCMV-FM =

Coordinates: 44.772°N 85.683°W

- Leland, Michigan; United States
- Broadcast area: Traverse City
- Frequency: 94.3 MHz

Ownership
- Owner: Central Michigan University

History
- First air date: 1994 (as WIAR)
- Former call signs: WLEL (1989–1991); WTRV (1991–1994); WIAR (1994–1997); WBYB (1997–2003); WFCX (2003–2020)
- Call sign meaning: W Central Michigan UniVersity

Technical information
- Licensing authority: FCC
- Facility ID: 49575
- Class: C2
- ERP: 20,500 watts
- HAAT: 233 metres (764 ft)

Links
- Public license information: Public file; LMS

WCMV-FM is a radio station licensed to Leland, Michigan operating at 94.3 mHz. Owned by Central Michigan University, it serves Traverse City as a full-time satellite of WCMU-FM. Until February 29, 2020, it simulcast an Adult Hits format with WFDX branded as Music Radio, The Fox FM. WCMV-FM serves the Traverse City area with 20,500 watts.

== History ==
In the early 1990s, the station signed on as WIAR 94.3, an oldies station simulcasting WAIR.

On Thanksgiving 1997, WIAR flipped to country as B94.3 and their call letters changed to WBYB. WAIR remained oldies for more than a year until they started simulcasting with WBYB again under the new name B92.5/B94.3 with their call set being WBYC.

On February 24, 2003, The Bee flipped to classic hits as The Fox. Since revising its format, The Fox FM's ratings increased noticeably, as the station had drawn listeners from competing stations WCCW-FM and WGFN.

92.5 WFDX had a slight delay from 94.3 WFCX, and thus the two signals had different liners that indicated the frequency. WFCX was identified in liners as "94-3 The Fox FM," and WFDX as "92-5 The Fox FM." However, the DJs referred to the station only as "The Fox FM."

In the fall of 2009, The Fox began identifying as "Music Radio, The Fox FM," added a jingle package similar to those of legendary Top 40 stations WABC and WLS in the 1970s, and revised the classic hits format by moving back in an oldies direction. As of August 2018, The Fox aired an Adult hits format playing songs from the 80s to today.

On December 5, 2019, the trustees of Central Michigan University approved the purchase of WFCX from Northern Radio of Michigan. In the press release announcing the purchase, the trustees noted that, "Acquisition of the station will expand WCMU's reach to all of the Grand Traverse and north central Michigan regions.". The station were to sign off the air Feb 29, according to their Facebook page. Both WFCX and WFDX have since been silent. WFDX and W263CD were not included in the sale of WFCX. A buyer for WFDX had not been found as of March 16, 2020.

The purchase of WFCX was consummated on April 30, 2020 at a price of $500,000. On the same day, the station changed its call sign to WCMV-FM. This gave Traverse City a second choice for NPR programming alongside Interlochen Public Radio. It also restored NPR news programming to Cadillac, the market's second largest city. IPR news outlet WICA does not cover Cadillac very well, and that city had been without a clear signal for NPR news programming since WICA took that programming from WIAA.

== Sources ==
- Michiguide.com - WFCX History
