= WIDG =

Coordinates: 45°51′44″N 84°46′55″W

- St. Ignace, Michigan; United States
- Broadcast area: Straits of Mackinac (Daytime) (Nighttime)
- Frequency: 940 kHz
- Branding: Relevant Radio

Programming
- Format: Catholic talk
- Affiliations: Relevant Radio

Ownership
- Owner: Relevant Radio, Inc.
- Sister stations: WTCY (originating station)

History
- First air date: 1966
- Former call signs: WLVM (7/30/82-5/6/85); WIDG (1966-7/30/82)
- Call sign meaning: The Widge by the Bridge

Technical information
- Licensing authority: FCC
- Facility ID: 42146
- Class: D
- Power: 5,000 watts day 4 watts night

Links
- Public license information: Public file; LMS
- Webcast: Listen Live
- Website: www.relevantradio.com

WIDG (940 AM) is a radio station licensed to St. Ignace, Michigan, broadcasting a Catholic religious format. Until October 2008, the station was owned and operated by Northern Star Broadcasting and had aired ESPN Radio under the brand name AM 940 The Fan. The station then went silent for a short period and returned to the air in December 2008, simulcasting originating station WTCK 90.9 FM in Charlevoix and later WTCY 88.3 FM in Greilickville and serving Traverse City.. WIDG was previously owned by Baraga Broadcasting and now owned by Relevant Radio.

Its main studio is now located in Traverse City, as such the originating station is now WTCY. WIDG transmits from a single guyed omnidirectional antenna at 1230 Old Portage Trail in St. Ignace.

== History ==
Founded in 1966 by Donald E. Benson's Mighty-Mac Broadcasting Company, WIDG was just the second radio station to launch in the Eastern Upper Peninsula of Michigan (following WSOO in Sault Ste. Marie.) The construction permit was issued in April 1961. Studios were initially located at 334 N. State Street in St. Ignace.

The station was known for many years as "Widge by the Bridge" and aired mainly middle of the road music, at times a blend of top 40.

The nickname "Widge by the Bridge" was coined by a longtime friend of station founder Donald E. Benson, a Lansing-based dentist who thought WITL-Lansing's slogan "Whittle while you work" was something that WIDG needed. The original CP for the station had the call letters WSTI, "St. Ignace" but Benson felt the call letters looked like "Stye". In the late 1970s, Benson obtained a construction permit for an FM station that would become WMKC.

Construction on the new FM station began shortly after the license was granted on July 30, 1979; and in December of that same year, Benson also obtained a dark license for WIDG and kept the station dark until April 1981, when he was required to return WIDG to the air in order for WMKC to come on the air. WIDG returned with an MOR format until a format change to Big Band and standards and the call letters WLVM ("We Love Michigan", with the station's music format provided by TM's "TMOR" package). In 1985, the station returned to the WIDG calls with a top 40 oldies format until 1988, when WIDG simulcast sister FM's WMKC St. Ignace and WCKC-Cadillac's country music format.

Eventually, in the early 1990s, WIDG once again adopted separate programming from WMKC, airing first oldies (as "Cool 940") and then classic country (as "Classic KC Country") before the sports-talk format was introduced. WIDG was initially an affiliate of One-on-One Sports (which later became Sporting News Radio) before switching to the ESPN Radio feed.

WIDG operates with an omnidirectional antenna and with very low power after local sunset to avoid interference with the now-defunct CINW (formerly CBC Radio-owned CBM) in Montreal. In WIDG's heyday, it constantly fought for a good signal into the north and was stymied by 10 kW CKCY/920 Sault Ste. Marie, Ontario. WIDG's signal was obliterated by CKCY north of Rudyard. When CKCY went dark, WIDG finally got the full potential of its 5 kW signal and can be heard well into the province of Ontario.

Though CINW (the former CBC Radio-owned CBM) has been silent since 2010, WIDG must still power down from 5,000 watts to 4 watts at sunset per FCC rules.

On December 11, 2019, WIDG and its sister stations were acquired by Immaculate Heart Media, bringing Relevant Radio programming to Northern Michigan.

== FM translators ==
- W221CA 92.1 MHz in Gaylord

== New studios, offices in Traverse City ==
Baraga's main studio and offices were originally located at WTCK's studio at Indian River, Michigan, near The Cross in the Woods Catholic Shrine. It also airs national programming from EWTN Global Catholic Radio and Ave Maria Radio based at WDEO in Ypsilanti.

In the fall of 2014, Baraga Broadcasting announced plans for a new website The Catholic Light Dot Com which is now online and was used in transition from its former Indian River location to new studios in Traverse City, Michigan, thus making WTCY (licensed to Greilickville) which serves Traverse City the new originating station.

== See also ==
- WTCY 88.3 FM in Greilickville (originating station) which also serves Traverse City
- WGZR 89.1 FM in Alpena
- WTCK 90.9 FM in Charlevoix which also serves Harbor Springs, Indian River and Grayling
- WGJU 91.3 FM in East Tawas (the former WRQC)
- WMQU 1230 AM in Grayling (the former WGRY)
