= WSFP =

Smile FM radio station in Harrisville, Michigan

Coordinates: 44.7034°N 83.5242°W

- Harrisville, Michigan; United States
- Broadcast area
- Frequency: 88.1 MHz
- Branding: Smile FM

Programming
- Format: Contemporary Christian
- Affiliations: Smile FM Praise

Ownership
- Owner: Michigan Community Radio

History
- First air date: July 2006
- Former call signs: WKKM (2006 - 2008)
- Call sign meaning: W Smile Fm Praise

Technical information
- Licensing authority: FCC
- Class: C2
- ERP: 18,000 watts
- HAAT: 143 meters

Links
- Public license information: Public file; LMS
- Webcast: http://www.smile.fm/streaming/
- Website: http://www.smile.fm/

WSFP is a non-commercial, contemporary Christian FM radio station licensed to the Harrisville, Michigan area. The station broadcasts at 88.1 MHz, and is owned by Michigan Community Radio. WSFP simulcasts the Smile FM Praise contemporary Christian music format.

The original call letters for WSPF were WKKM. The call letters were changed to WSFP on October 1, 2008, to better identify the station as a part of the Smile FM Praise Network. The WKKM calls are now held by a Classic Country music station at 90.7 FM in Harrison, Michigan (where the original WKKM at 92.1 FM also operated).

In November 2007 WSFP filed an application with the FCC to change the community of license to Harrisville, Michigan, and move to 88.1 MHz with an increase to 3 kW. The new tower would be adjacent to the one currently used by WJOJ which would exchange its community of license with WSFP. A construction permit was issued on September 14, 2010, to increase power to 18 kW on 88.1, move the community of license to Harrisville, and move the transmitter to the same tower as WJOJ.

Until June 1997 the call letters WSFP were those of the stations now known as WGCU (TV) and WGCU-FM in Fort Myers, Florida.

== Sources ==
- Michiguide.com - WSFP History
