= WSBX (FM) =

Radio station in Mackinaw City, Michigan, United States

Coordinates: 45.667°N 84.635°W

Simulcasting WUPN Paradise
- Mackinaw City, Michigan; United States
- Broadcast area
- Frequency: 94.5 MHz
- Branding: 94.5/95.1 The Bridge

Programming
- Format: Classic hits

Ownership
- Owner: Billy Sours; (Whiskey Sours Broadcasting and Productions, LLC)

History
- First air date: September 6, 1989 (as WSSW at 94.3)
- Former call signs: WSSW (1986–1993); WFGE (1993–1995); WLJZ (1995–2012); WOEZ (2012–2013); WJZJ (2013); WYPV (2013–2023)
- Former frequencies: 94.3 MHz (1989–1995)

Technical information
- Licensing authority: FCC
- Facility ID: 53290
- Class: C2
- ERP: 50,000 watts
- HAAT: 116 meters (381 ft)

Links
- Public license information: Public file; LMS
- Webcast: Listen live
- Website: bridgefm.net

WSBX (94.5 FM) is a radio station based in Mackinaw City, Michigan.

== History ==
The station's original call sign was WSSW (for the station's founder, Sonora S. Wray), which was first issued in October 1986. WSSW first signed on at 94.3 on September 6, 1989, with an automated MOR format, but went dark not long after that. The station, while at 94.3, was a Class A station with an ERP of 3,000 watts, which made the station all but unlistenable outside of the Mackinaw City-St. Ignace area, a seasonal, tourist-driven market barely able to sustain the competing radio stations that were already on the air and firmly established. WSSW's management thought that perhaps packing the station with tourist-related information for the local area would help reverse its fortunes. The station did improve, but not enough. Wray sold the station to Robert A. Naismith in February 1992.

Naismith returned the station to the air in 1993 with a hot adult contemporary format as WFGE, known as "Fudgie 94" (as in Mackinac Island's famous fudge). In 1994, the station adopted Jones Radio Networks' satellite-fed smooth jazz format as "Coast FM". In 1995, the station changed its call sign to WLJZ and changed its frequency to 94.5 with an increase in power to 18,500 watts ERP, which increased its broadcast area substantially to include most of the northern tip of the lower peninsula, bringing a better signal to Petoskey, Gaylord, and Rogers City and reaching almost as far north as Sault Ste. Marie (though the station did, and still does, suffer from interference from co-channel WCEN-FM in the southern fringes of its listening area). In 1997, WJZJ 95.5 in Glen Arbor, Michigan and WAVC 93.9 FM in Mio, Michigan began simulcasting WLJZ.

In 1998, the smooth jazz "Coast FM" format was dropped in favor of a modern rock format as "The Zone." In March 2001, WAVC dropped out of the "Zone" simulcast, and began simulcasting country sister WMKC.

In 2006, WLJZ also abandoned the "Zone" simulcast in favor of a standalone Hot AC format using Waitt Radio Networks' AC Active package, taking the name "Star 94.5". This left WJZJ as the only remaining "Zone" station.

On April 1, 2008, WLJZ changed its format to classic country, branded "Big Country Gold". The classic country package complemented the "Big Country Hits" contemporary-country format on sister stations WMKC and WAVC.

In April 2010, WLJZ announced on-air that its classic country format would be moving to AM sister station WCBY AM 1240, displacing the adult standards format formerly heard there. WLJZ adopted a classic rock format, simulcasting "The Bear" format originating on 98.1 WGFN in Traverse City, Michigan.

On December 5, 2012, WLJZ changed its call sign to WOEZ.

On May 1, 2013, WOEZ changed its call sign to WJZJ.

On May 10, 2013, WJZJ changed its call sign to WYPV. This coincided with a planned station swap between Northern Star Broadcasting and Michigan Broadcasters, LLC involving 94.5 FM Mackinaw City and 106.3 FM Onaway, Michigan. 94.5 FM picked up the "Patriot Voice" talk format formerly heard on 106.3, and 106.3 went to Northern Star to become WOEZ, relaying WQEZ 95.5 FM in the Traverse City area. At the same time, the "Bear" classic rock format moved to 97.7 WCHY licensed to Cheboygan, Michigan.

Effective November 9, 2018, Michigan Broadcasters sold WYPV to John Yob's Mitten News LLC for $200,000.

On November 7, 2019, WYPV changed its format from talk to adult contemporary, branded as "94.5 & 106.3 North FM".

On June 22, 2020, WYPV changed its format from adult contemporary to a simulcast of album-oriented rock-formatted WQON 100.3 FM Grayling.

On March 31, 2023, WYPV went silent, due to the end of an LMA between Blarney Stone Broadcasting and Mitten News.

Effective July 31, 2023, Mitten News sold WYPV to Billy Sours' Whiskey Sours Broadcasting and Productions, LLC for $140,000. On August 2, the station changed its call sign to WSBX. On August 4, 2023, WSBX returned to the air with a classic rock/classic hits hybrid format.

On April 30, 2024, WSBX switched to a simulcast of WUPN 95.1 FM Paradise, rebranding as "94.5/95.1 The Bridge".
