= WCDY =

Coordinates: 44.171°N 85.337°W

- Cadillac, Michigan; United States
- Broadcast area: Cadillac
- Frequency: 107.9 MHz
- Branding: The New 107.9 CDY

Programming
- Format: Adult contemporary

Ownership
- Owner: Up North Radio, LLC
- Sister stations: WBZX, WCKC

History
- First air date: October 27, 2010
- Call sign meaning: Caddy (refers to the city)

Technical information
- Licensing authority: FCC
- Facility ID: 183306
- Class: A
- ERP: 3,100 watts
- HAAT: 140 meters

Links
- Public license information: Public file; LMS
- Website: 1079cdy.com

WCDY (107.9 FM) is a radio station licensed to McBain, Michigan and serving the Cadillac area, broadcasting an adult contemporary format.

The station launched on November 6, 2010 with a temporary format of Christmas music. The permanent format debuted on December 27, 2010, three months after it first signed on. Over its first 5 years, the station has grown from being an Adult Top 40 (using the slogan "Cadillac's Hits Without The Rap") to a full CHR using the slogan "Cadillac's New Number One". The station, in an unusual twist for a CHR, still flips to all Christmas just after Thanksgiving each year. On Friday, August 9, 2024 at noon, the station began stunting with five hours of songs from various genres, and on 5pm that day, it shifted from Top 40 to adult contemporary, while retaining the same branding and launching a new slogan, “Cadillac’s Best Mix”.

WCDY is owned and operated by Jennifer Theodore, doing business as "Up North Radio, LLC." Theodore is the wife of Dom Theodore, former Vice President of CHR Programming for CBS Radio, including Detroit CHR station WDZH, and former programmer of WDZH's competitor station WKQI.
