= WTCK =

Coordinates: 45.5014°N 85.0302°W

- Charlevoix, Michigan; United States
- Frequency: 90.9 MHz
- Branding: Relevant Radio

Programming
- Format: Catholic radio
- Network: Relevant Radio

Ownership
- Owner: Relevant Radio, Inc.

History
- First air date: May 2003
- Former call signs: WWCZ (2003–2004)
- Call sign meaning: To Christ the King

Technical information
- Licensing authority: FCC
- Facility ID: 121256
- Class: C2
- ERP: 5,500 watts
- HAAT: 303.6 meters (996 ft)
- Translator: 92.1 W221CA (Gaylord)

Links
- Public license information: Public file; LMS
- Webcast: Listen live
- Website: relevantradio.com

WTCK (90.9 FM) is a radio station broadcasting a Catholic religious format. Licensed to Charlevoix, Michigan, United States, the station is currently owned by Relevant Radio and currently airs programming from the network. The station's former owner, Baraga Broadcasting, was named for the Catholic missionary to Native American tribes and later Venerable Bishop Frederik Baraga. It served as the first originating station of Baraga's six station network airing local Catholic programming in addition to network programming from EWTN Global Catholic Radio and from Ave Maria Radio based at WDEO in Ypsilanti, Michigan. Its main office and studio was located at Indian River near The Cross in the Woods Catholic Shrine and has since moved in the spring of 2015 to Traverse City.

== History ==
WTCK began as a construction permit issued by the FCC to Broadcasting For The Challenged Inc. in April 2003. On May 15 of that year the call letters WWCZ were granted. In May 2006, the new FM, after having its construction permit modified, began broadcasting Catholic programming. Later, in September Baraga Broadcasting purchased WWCZ from the original licensee, which was approved by the FCC in November of that same year.

On December 11, 2019, WTCK and its sister stations were acquired by Immaculate Heart Media, bringing Relevant Radio programming to Northern Michigan.

== Baraga Broadcasting ==
WTCK programming is also heard in St. Ignace on simulcast station WIDG 940 AM (formerly a commercial station that had a variety of formats through the years).

On October 22, 2011, another station was added to the Baraga Broadcasting family when WRQC at 91.3 FM in East Tawas returned to the air after a lengthy period of silence, prior to which the station had programmed a contemporary Christian music format under the ownership of Northern Christian Radio. WRQC has since changed its call letters to WGJU.

In July 2012, Baraga also began broadcasting on WGZR 89.1 FM in Alpena, at first licensed to All Saints School, then sold to Baraga in October 2011 which was given FCC approval the following month of that year.

A new logo and branding "Baraga Radio" was introduced in the fall of 2014 in addition to announcing that its offices and studios will be moving to the Traverse City area .

== Sister stations ==
- WTCY 88.3 MHz licensed to Greilickville serving the Traverse City area.
- WGZR 88.9 MHz in Alpena
- WGJU 91.3 MHz in East Tawas

== AM sister station ==
- WIDG 940 kHz in St. Ignace also serving Mackinaw City, Sault Sainte Marie and the eastern Upper Peninsula

== Affiliate ==
- WMQU 1230 kHz in Grayling
