= WCKC =

Radio station in Cadillac, Michigan

Coordinates: 44°10′16″N 85°20′13″W

- Cadillac, Michigan; United States
- Broadcast area: Cadillac, Michigan
- Frequency: 107.1 MHz
- Branding: 107.1 The Drive

Programming
- Format: Classic rock

Ownership
- Owner: Up North Radio, LLC
- Sister stations: WBZX, WCDY

History
- First air date: 1985 (as WYTW)
- Former call signs: WITW (1984–1985, CP); WYTW (1985–1991)
- Call sign meaning: Cadillac KC Country (Previous format)

Technical information
- Licensing authority: FCC
- Facility ID: 22183
- Class: A
- ERP: 2,750 watts
- HAAT: 147 meters

Links
- Public license information: Public file; LMS
- Website: 1071thedrive.com

WCKC (107.1 FM, "The Drive") is a radio station in Cadillac, Michigan, owned by Up North Radio, LLC. WCKC airs a classic rock format.

== History ==
In 1985 Donald "Doc" Benson, then-owner of WMKC-FM/WIDG-AM in St. Ignace, obtained the CP (Construction Permit) for a new FM in Cadillac at 107.1. Cadillac previously had a WITW (now WLXV) and Doc reportedly believed he could capitalize on the "good will" of the other station's calls and came up with WYTW. It was called Y-107 and ran satellite adult contemporary music for a short period, but the station was unable to make enough money to pay its expenses. In 1989 WYTW changed to WCKC ("Cadillac KC Country") and simulcast with WMKC and WIDG. This continued until 1996, when WCKC, WMKC and WIDG were sold to Del Reynolds, WCKC became a member of the "Bear" network. (See WMKC article for more information).

On September 29, 2016, at 4PM, WCKC split from its simulcast with WGFN and WCHY and launched its own classic rock format as "107.1 The Drive". The first song on The Drive was "Rock 'n Roll All Nite" by Kiss.
