= Boyne City, Michigan =

- City
- City of Boyne City
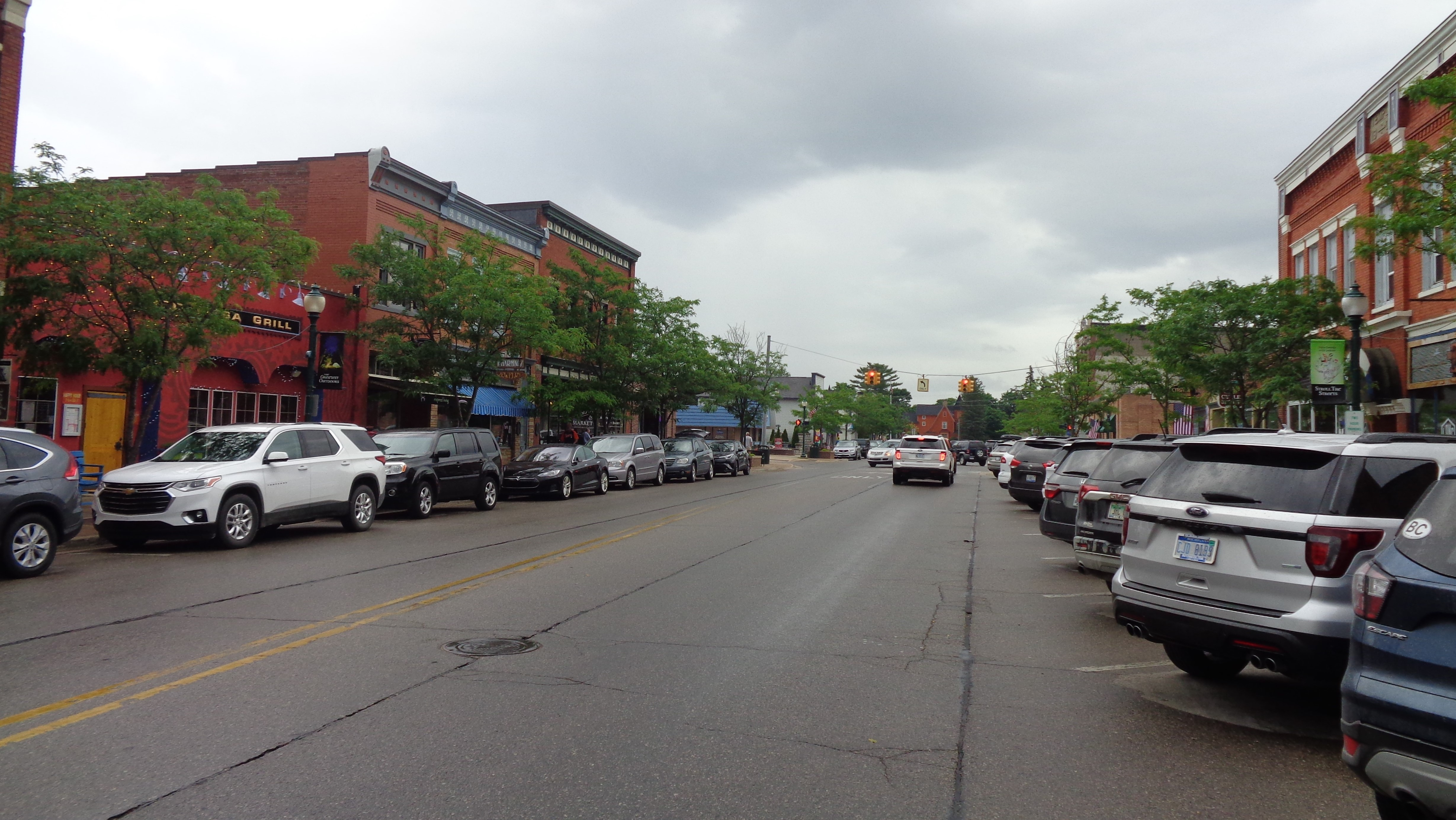
- Looking east along Water Street in the Boyne City Central Historic District
- Motto: "Where Life Meets Lake"
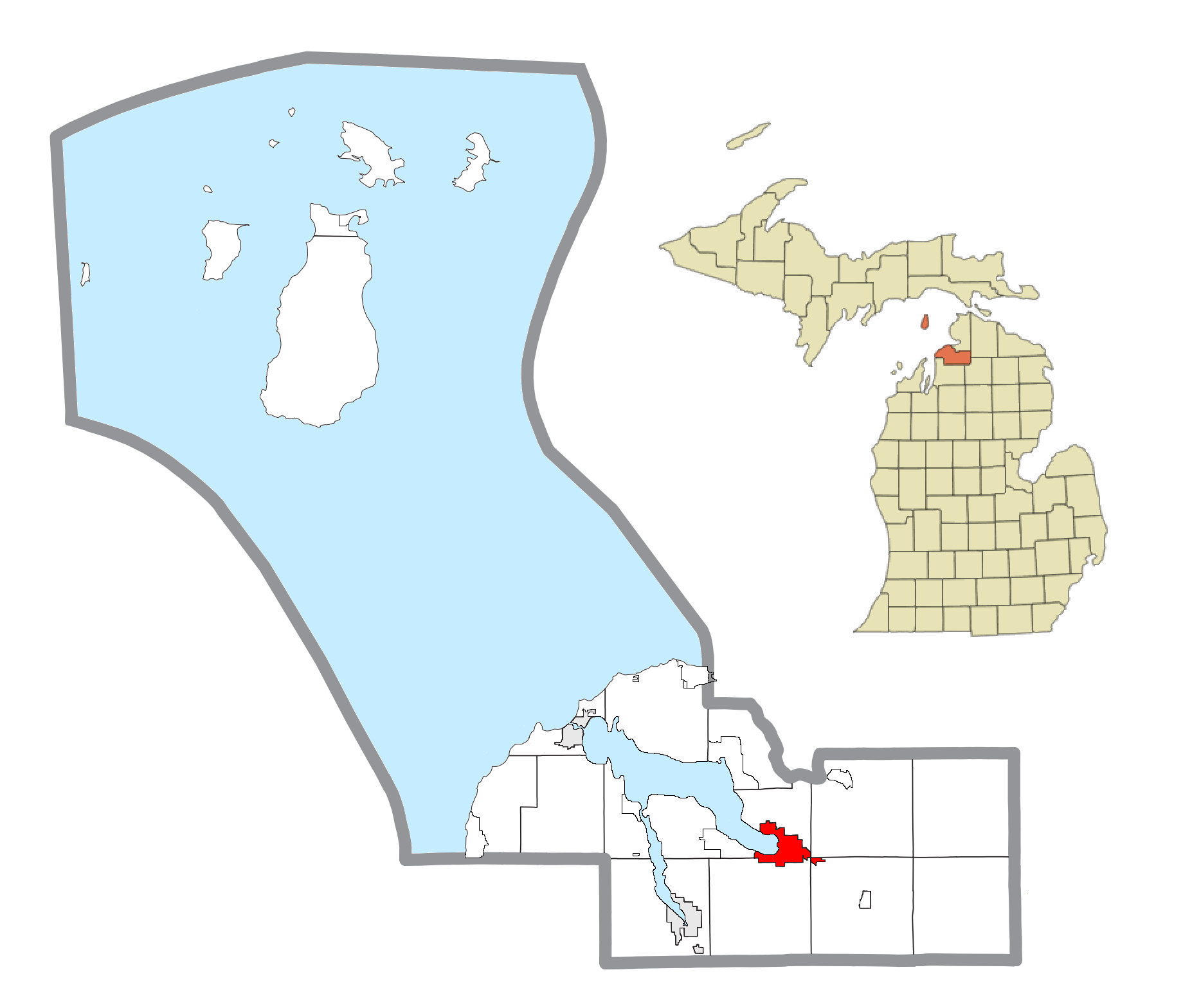
- Location within Charlevoix County

- Location within the state of Michigan Location within the United States
- Coordinates: 45°12′44″N 85°00′50″W
- Country: United States
- State: Michigan
- County: Charlevoix
- Settled: 1856
- Incorporated: 1885 (village); 1907 (city)

Government
  - Type: City commission
  - Mayor: Bob Farrell
  - Manager: Sam Demel
  - Clerk: Jessica Puroll

Area
  - Total: 5.34 sq mi (13.82 km^{2})
  - Land: 3.98 sq mi (10.32 km^{2})
  - Water: 1.35 sq mi (3.50 km^{2})
- Elevation: 594 ft (181 m)

Population (2020)
  - Total: 3,816
  - Density: 957.7/sq mi (369.77/km^{2})
- Time zone: UTC−5 (Eastern (EST))
  - Summer (DST): UTC−4 (EDT)
- ZIP code(s): 49712
- Area code: 231
- FIPS code: 26-09820
- GNIS feature ID: 0621826
- Website: www.boynecity.gov

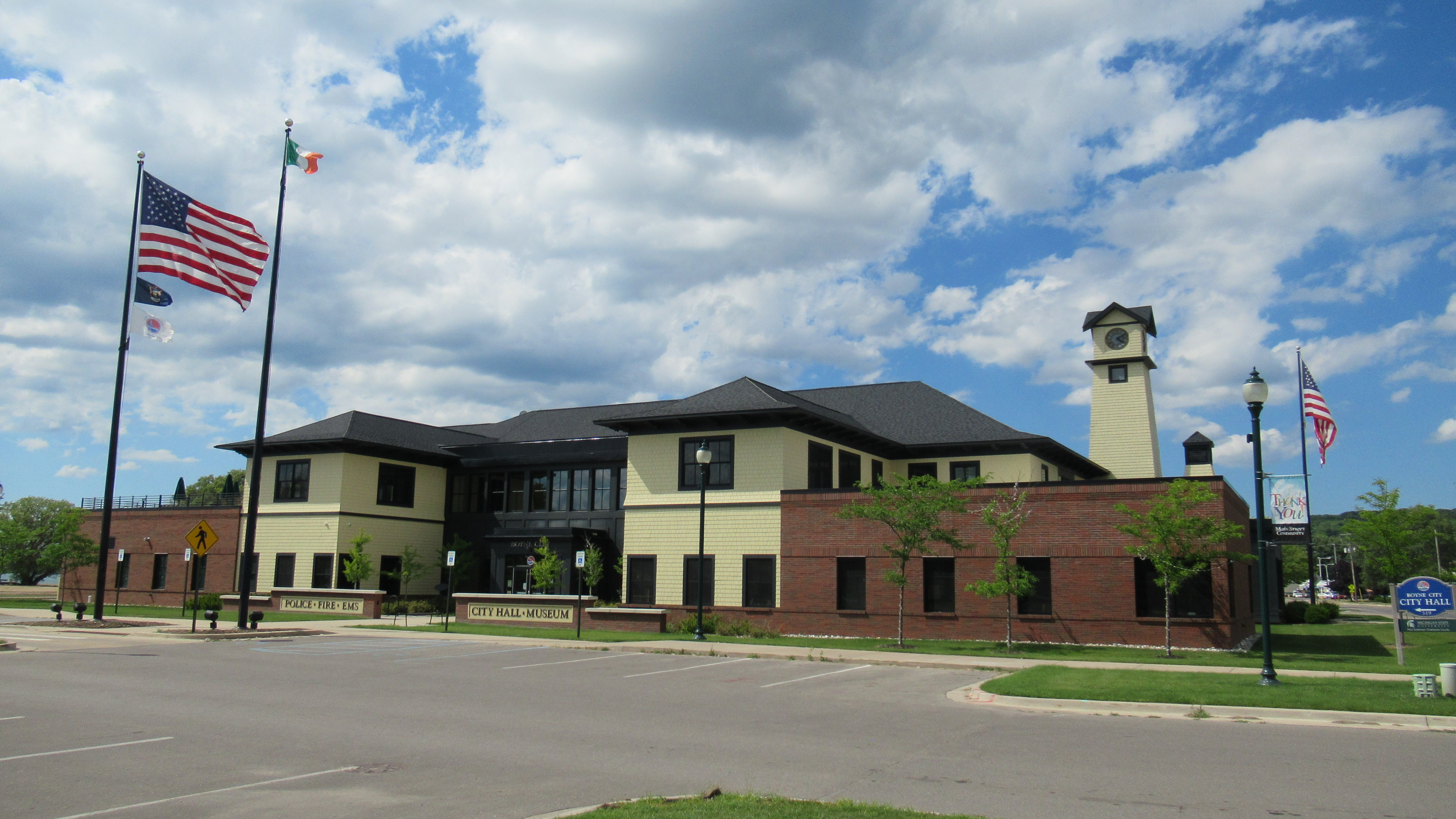
City hall and municipal building

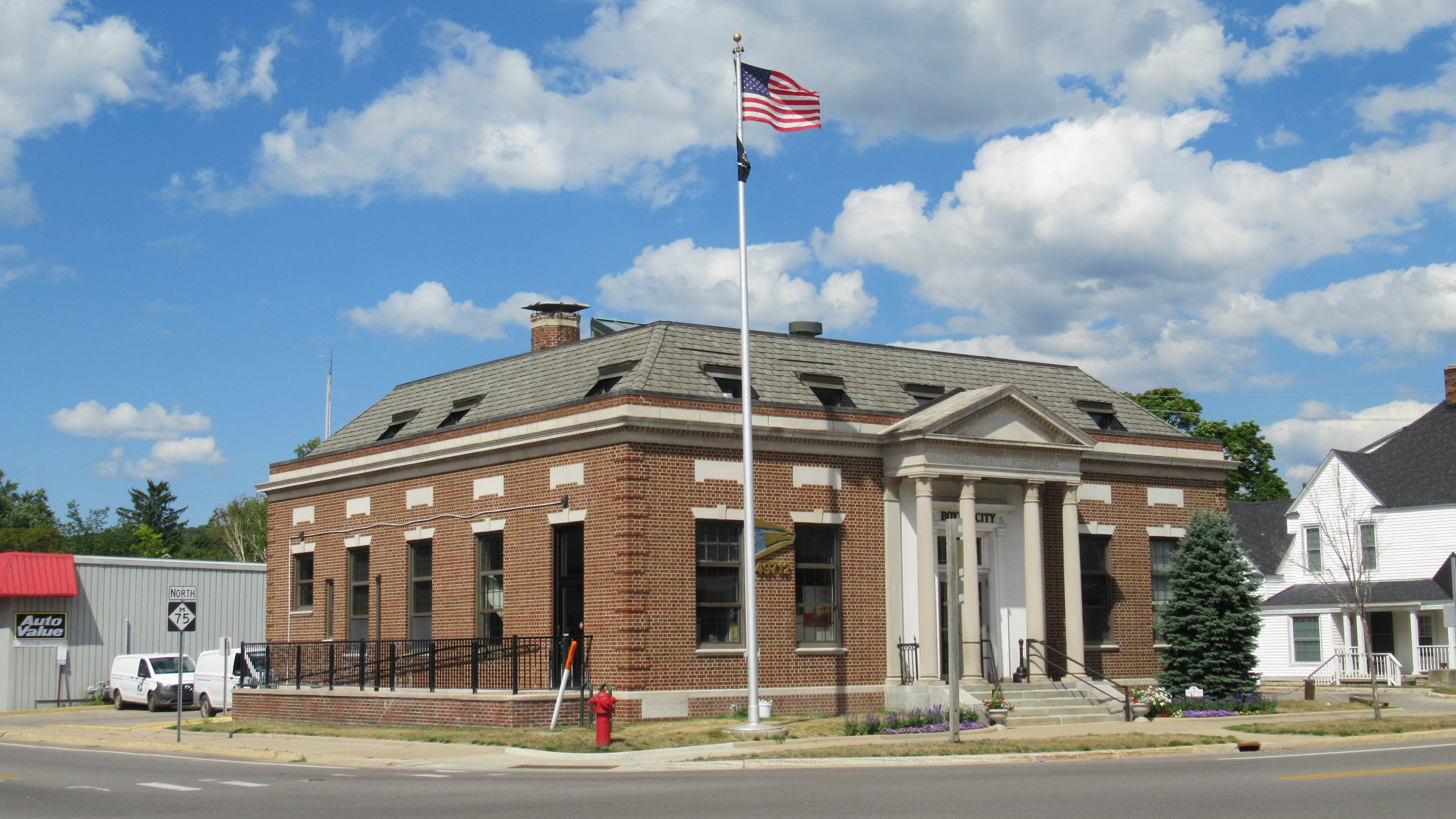
U.S. Post Office in Boyne City

Boyne City (/bɔɪn/) is a city in Charlevoix County in the U.S. state of Michigan. The population was 3,816 at the 2020 census, making it the largest city in Charlevoix County. Boyne City is located at the eastern end of Lake Charlevoix, Michigan's third largest inland lake. The city is also the site of the mouth of the Boyne River, named for the River Boyne in Leinster, Ireland.

== History ==
The area was first settled as early as 1856 by the families of John Dixon and John Miller in 1856, which was part of Emmet County until Charlevoix County was organized in 1869. Miller first named the settlement Boyne, as it was near the already-named Boyne River, which derived its name from a river in Ireland. A post office named Boyne opened on September 29, 1869, with Miller serving as the first postmaster. Others moved to the area with the opening of the Pine Lake House by A. J. Hall in 1879. The community incorporated as a village in 1885 and was renamed Boyne City in 1904. It incorporated as a city in 1907.

Boyne City after a destructive fire in 1908

Boyne City was home to the Buelah Home, which was built by Herman Swift in 1902. It served as a housing facility for delinquent boys. By 1910, the Buelah Home housed approximately 200 boys, who were also reviled by the community for committing numerous crimes and causing mischief. Soon after, Swift was accused of molesting numerous boys under his care, and criminal charges were filed. It became a cause célèbre in Northern Michigan, and it made headlines throughout the country. Many boys who accused Swift of the charges dropped out of the lawsuit to avoid public scrutiny. The case dragged on for three years before eventually making its way to the Michigan Supreme Court under chief justice Joseph H. Steere. Swift was acquitted, but it led to the Buelah Home being closed in 1912 and demolished in 1920.

The city contains two listings on the National Register of Historic Places. The downtown area along Lake Street and Water Street has been included into the Boyne City Central Historic District. The municipal Boyne City Water Works Building was constructed in 1910 when the city was experiencing a tremendous growth in population, and the building continues to serve its purpose as a city water system booster station.

== Geography ==
According to the U.S. Census Bureau, the city has a total area of 5.34 square miles (13.83 km^{2}), of which 3.98 square miles (10.31 km^{2}) is land and 1.35 square miles (3.50 km^{2}) is water.

The principal geographic feature of the city is Lake Charlevoix. The Boyne River also flows through this city into Lake Charlevoix. Young State Park is just northwest of the city limits in Evangeline Township.

=== Climate ===
This climatic region has large seasonal temperature differences, with warm to hot (and often humid) summers and cold (sometimes severely cold) winters. According to the Köppen Climate Classification system, Boyne City has a humid continental climate, abbreviated "Dfb" on climate maps.

Climate data for Boyne City, Michigan
Month	Jan	Feb	Mar	Apr	May	Jun	Jul	Aug	Sep	Oct	Nov	Dec	Year
Record high °F (°C)	52 (11)	55 (13)	67 (19)	84 (29)	90 (32)	97 (36)	100 (38)	102 (39)	98 (37)	85 (29)	75 (24)	64 (18)	102 (39)
Mean daily maximum °F (°C)	28 (−2)	31 (−1)	37 (3)	54 (12)	68 (20)	77 (25)	81 (27)	80 (27)	70 (21)	61 (16)	43 (6)	32 (0)	55 (13)
Daily mean °F (°C)	20 (−7)	21 (−6)	26 (−3)	42 (6)	53 (12)	63 (17)	67 (19)	66 (19)	58 (14)	49 (9)	35 (2)	25 (−4)	44 (7)
Mean daily minimum °F (°C)	12 (−11)	11 (−12)	16 (−9)	30 (−1)	39 (4)	49 (9)	53 (12)	52 (11)	46 (8)	38 (3)	27 (−3)	18 (−8)	33 (1)
Record low °F (°C)	−24 (−31)	−29 (−34)	−19 (−28)	−3 (−19)	16 (−9)	25 (−4)	34 (1)	31 (−1)	22 (−6)	16 (−9)	−10 (−23)	−21 (−29)	−29 (−34)
Average precipitation inches (mm)	2.0 (51)	1.8 (46)	1.7 (43)	2.7 (69)	2.6 (66)	4.4 (110)	3.2 (81)	3.0 (76)	3.7 (94)	3.0 (76)	2.9 (74)	2.4 (61)	33.3 (850)

== Transportation ==
=== Major highways ===
- M-75 curves and runs through the city.
- C-56 (Lake Street) is a county-designated highway that runs through the north portion of the city before terminating M-75.
- C-73 (Boyne City Road) is a county-designated highway that enters the city briefly from the south and terminates at M-75.

=== Airport ===
- Boyne City Municipal Airport is a public use airport located in the city limits.

=== Railroad ===
- Boyne City Railroad was a railway company based in Boyne City from 1893 to 1978. Boyne City once contained its own train station along the larger Boyne City, Gaylord & Alpena Railroad.

== Demographics ==
Historical population
Census	Pop.	Note	%±
1890	450		—
1900	912		102.7%
1910	5,218		472.1%
1920	4,284		−17.9%
1930	2,650		−38.1%
1940	2,904		9.6%
1950	3,028		4.3%
1960	2,797		−7.6%
1970	2,969		6.1%
1980	3,348		12.8%
1990	3,478		3.9%
2000	3,503		0.7%
2010	3,735		6.6%
2020	3,816		2.2%
U.S. Decennial Census

=== 2020 census ===
As of the 2020 census, Boyne City had a population of 3,816. The median age was 46.0 years. 20.2% of residents were under the age of 18, and 23.9% were 65 years of age or older. For every 100 females, there were 93.9 males, and for every 100 females age 18 and over, there were 92.1 males age 18 and over.

97.7% of residents lived in urban areas, while 2.3% lived in rural areas.

There were 1,687 households in Boyne City, of which 23.5% had children under the age of 18 living in them. Of all households, 41.6% were married-couple households, 19.6% were households with a male householder and no spouse or partner present, and 31.4% were households with a female householder and no spouse or partner present. About 35.9% of all households were made up of individuals, and 17.5% had someone living alone who was 65 years of age or older.

There were 2,298 housing units, of which 26.6% were vacant. The homeowner vacancy rate was 1.6%, and the rental vacancy rate was 9.0%.

Racial composition as of the 2020 census
Race	Number	Percent
White	3,500	91.7%
Black or African American	12	0.3%
American Indian and Alaska Native	28	0.7%
Asian	30	0.8%
Native Hawaiian and Other Pacific Islander	0	0.0%
Some other race	28	0.7%
Two or more races	218	5.7%
Hispanic or Latino (of any race)	68	1.8%

=== 2010 census ===
As of the 2010 census, there were 3,735 people, 1,635 households, and 1,011 families living in the city. The population density was 920.0 inhabitants per square mile (355.2/km^{2}). There were 2,292 housing units at an average density of 564.5 per square mile (218.0/km^{2}). The racial makeup of the city was 94.9% White, 0.4% African American, 0.7% Native American, 0.5% Asian, 0.1% Pacific Islander, 0.3% from other races, and 3.2% from two or more races. Hispanic or Latino of any race were 1.3% of the population.

There were 1,635 households, of which 29.8% had children under the age of 18 living with them, 43.8% were married couples living together, 13.1% had a female householder with no husband present, 4.9% had a male householder with no wife present, and 38.2% were non-families. 33.4% of all households were made up of individuals, and 14.8% had someone living alone who was 65 years of age or older. The average household size was 2.27 and the average family size was 2.85.

The median age in the city was 41.9 years. 23.9% of residents were under the age of 18; 7.5% were between the ages of 18 and 24; 22.6% were from 25 to 44; 29% were from 45 to 64; and 16.9% were 65 years of age or older. The gender makeup of the city was 48.5% male and 51.5% female.

=== 2000 census ===
As of the 2000 census, there were 3,503 people, 1,468 households, and 932 families living in the city. The population density was 896.7 inhabitants per square mile (346.2/km^{2}). There were 1,935 housing units at an average density of 495.3 per square mile (191.2/km^{2}). The racial makeup of the city was 96.92% White, 0.11% African American, 1.14% Native American, 0.17% Asian, 0.06% Pacific Islander, 0.40% from other races, and 1.20% from two or more races. Hispanic or Latino of any race were 0.74% of the population.

There were 1,468 households, out of which 31.5% had children under the age of 18 living with them, 49.6% were married couples living together, 10.7% had a female householder with no husband present, and 36.5% were non-families. 31.7% of all households were made up of individuals, and 15.0% had someone living alone who was 65 years of age or older. The average household size was 2.38 and the average family size was 3.01.

In the city, the population was spread out, with 26.4% under the age of 18, 7.4% from 18 to 24, 28.5% from 25 to 44, 22.0% from 45 to 64, and 15.8% who were 65 years of age or older. The median age was 38 years. For every 100 females, there were 95.4 males. For every 100 females aged 18 and over, there were 90.6 males.

The median income for a household in the city was $35,819, and the median income for a family was $44,096. Males had a median income of $29,558 versus $22,583 for females. The per capita income for the city was $19,030. About 8.9% of families and 11.8% of the population were below the poverty line, including 18.2% of those under age 18 and 6.7% of those aged 65 or over.

== Culture ==
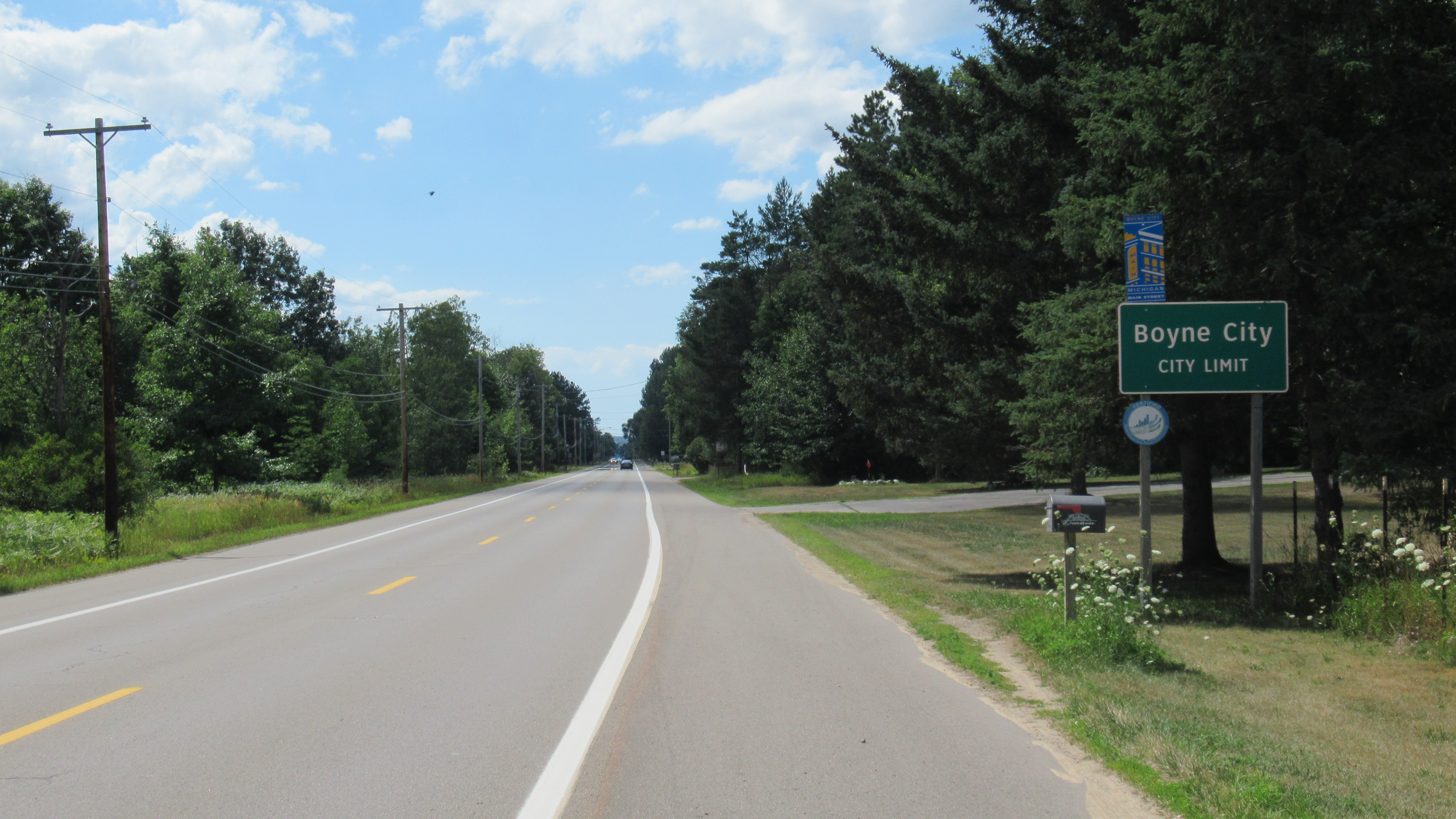
Road signage along M-75

=== Events ===
- Boyne City hosts the National Morel Mushroom Festival annually in May.
- Boyne City Fourth of July.

=== Sports ===
- Boyne City Boosters were a minor league baseball team that was part of the Michigan State League from 1911 to 1914.

== Education ==
Boyne City is served entirely by its own school district, Boyne City Public Schools, which serves the city and large portions of several neighboring townships.

== Notable people ==
- Kaila Kuhn, freestyle skier, 2026 Olympic gold medalist in mixed team aerials, born in Boyne City.
- Charles Archibald Nichols, state politician who served in the U.S. House of Representatives, born in Boyne City
- John William Tebbel, journalist, editor, writer, teacher, and media historian who was born in Boyne City.
