= Cross in the Woods =

Catholic shrine in Indian River, Michigan

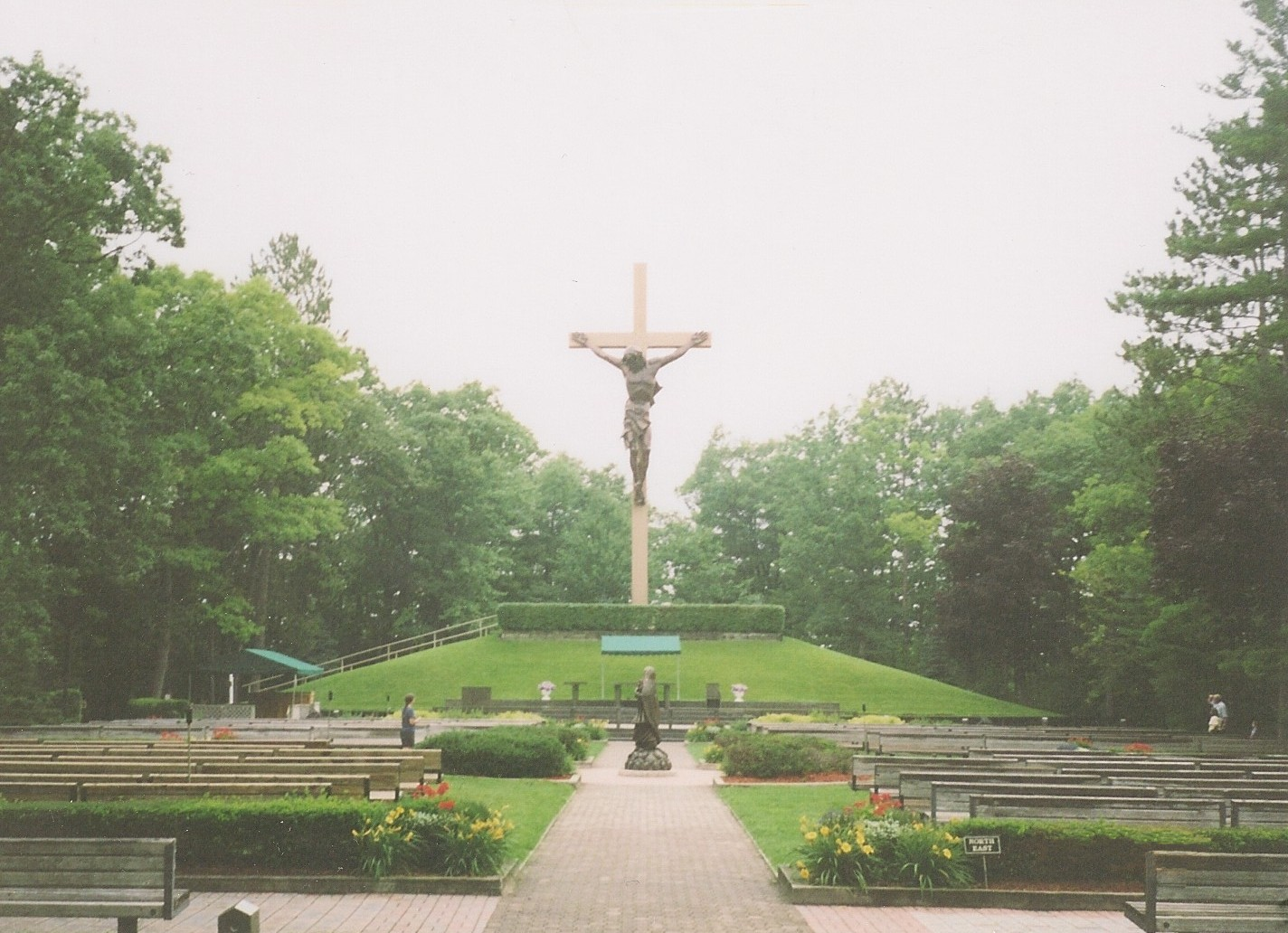
Cross in the Woods

The Cross in the Woods is a Catholic shrine at 7078 M-68 in Indian River, Michigan. It was declared a national shrine by the United States Conference of Catholic Bishops (USCCB) on September 15, 2006. At 55 feet tall, it is the second largest crucifix in the world. The largest Crucifix is in Bardstown, KY, at 60 feet high. The largest Christian cross in the world stands at 492 feet (150m), located in the Valley of the Fallen, Spain.

The Crucifix has become one of the most famous and most frequently visited shrines in all of Michigan. The highlight of the shrine is a large wooden cross and bronze figure of Christ by sculptor Marshall Fredericks. The site also includes outdoor and indoor churches, numerous smaller shrines, and a nun doll museum. The Cross in the Woods is open 365 days a year, and the Church built at this location holds Masses daily, year round. Each year, between 275,000 and 325,000 people visit the Cross in the Woods Shrine.

== History ==
=== The original Long House Church and the Cross ===
In April 1946, Bishop Francis J. Haas of the Diocese of Grand Rapids searched for land to establish a new church in Indian River for parishioners who were traveling great distances to attend Mass. Mr. James J. Harrington, a resident of Burt Lake, offered to help locate land for the new church, which would put in place the first residential priest of Cheboygan County. He came across the undeveloped Burt Lake State Park property and sought to acquire the land, but the Michigan Department of Conservation denied his request.

In June 1946, Father Charles D. Brophy became the administrator of the future church and wanted to name the church after Blessed Kateri Tekakwitha, a seventeenth-century Mohawk Indian who enjoyed making small crosses and placing them in trees in the woods as shrines. However, he was unable to name the church after her because she had not yet been declared a saint.

Without a church in place yet, the parish held Masses in a town hall. One parishioner, J.J. Harrington, expressed great interest in an outdoor church that he had recently seen. Father Brophy liked the idea of an indoor church for year-round parishioners and an outdoor church for the summer and visitors. The outdoor church could also be seen as a way to attract tourists to the area.

Throughout the summer of 1946, plans for the grounds and the new church were presented, requesting the State Park land. "In May 1948, the Commission granted them the land for $1.00 and a box of candy for the secretary." The original church was built in a "long house" style and designed by Alden B. Dow, a student of Frank Lloyd Wright, to look upon the wooded area that surrounded it. It was completed by Memorial Day weekend of 1949. Today, this area houses the gift shop, main office and the nun doll museum in the lower level.

After discussion with Dow, Father Brophy decided to build the largest wooden crucifix in the world on Calvary Hill, located north of the Long House Chapel. In July 1952, Bishop Babcock permitted them to begin the project. The foundation of the Cross required a 15-foot (4.6 m) high steel and concrete base which was covered with soil, creating a hill 150 feet (46 m) long, 15 feet (4.6 m) high, and 75 feet (23 m) wide. In the summer of 1952, redwood timber was custom-cut with a chainsaw from a lumber yard in Oregon and shipped on a railroad flat car. It took two days to assemble the Cross. On August 5, 1954, cranes lifted it to the foundation, where it was secured. It stands 55 feet (17 m) tall.

Marshall Fredericks, a renowned Michigan sculptor, was contacted by Father Jerome Szydlowski of St Matthew's church in Boyne City and agreed to create the figure of Christ for the Cross. The process took four years from sketches to plaster mold. The figure was then cast in bronze at the Kristians-Kunst Metalstobori Foundry in Oslo, Norway. Weighing seven tons and 28 feet (8.5 m) tall from head to toe, it was one of the largest castings to ever be shipped across the Atlantic Ocean. Workers raised the sculpture into place on August 9, 1959, and attached to the Cross with 13 bolts 30 inches (760 mm) long and 2 inches (51 mm) in diameter. The formal dedication occurred seven days later.

Originally called the Indian River Catholic Shrine, the site became Cross in the Woods in 1983.

In 1992, because of weather damage, officials decided to clean the figure of Christ. The Jensen Foundation of Art Conservation cleaned, waxed and painted the bronze corpus over a period of several weeks. It has since been waxed by volunteers every two years.

=== The Holy Stairs ===
In 1956, the shrine added 28 stairs leading up Calvary Hill to the base of the Cross. These stairs represent the 28 stairs that Jesus climbed to the throne of Pontius Pilate, where he was condemned to death and therefore are named The Holy Stairs.

=== The New Church ===
After 50 years of praying before the Cross only in good weather and using the Long Chapel, seating 250 people, for all other Masses; the parishioners wished for a larger church that would also give year-round visibility of the Cross. On June 27, 1997, the dream became a reality when the shrine dedicated a new church. It holds 1,000 people and has large windows that allow worshipers to view the Cross while participating in Mass.

=== Becoming a National Shrine ===
After submitting a petition to become a national shrine, the United States Conference of Catholic Bishops declared The Cross in the Woods as such in 2006. It is one of two national shrines in Michigan (with National Shrine of the Little Flower in Royal Oak) and 120 in the United States.

== Shrines ==
Besides being a shrine itself, the Cross in the Woods also has many other smaller shrines on its grounds. These smaller shrines recognize influential people and important members of the Catholic faith.

- Our Lady of the Highway – Carved from carrara marble, the statue of Our Lady of the Highway was a gift from Mr. and Mrs. Leo Kuhlman in 1957. She is the patroness of all the travelers who visit the Cross in the Woods.
- Saint Peregrine – The patron of those who are suffering from cancer, St. Peregrine's shrine was first built in the 1960s. It was originally located in the entrance to the Shrine, where the Hall of Saints is presently, but now is in a newly built gazebo.
- Blessed Kateri Tekakwitha – The statue of Saint Kateri Tekakwitha is dedicated to Charles D. Brophy, the founder of the Shrine and Parish. It is located in the outdoor sanctuary, looking back towards the Cross. She was an important influence on the building of the Cross because of her habit of placing small crosses in the forest as places to stop and pray. She was canonized as a Saint by Pope Benedict XVI on October 21, 2012.
- Saint Francis of Assisi – Added to the Shrine in 1994, the statue of St. Francis of Assisi is specifically placed to the side of the Cross, gazing toward it representing Francis receiving orders from the Cross to repair Christ's church. St. Francis of Assisi is the patron of all those who work for peace and also the patron of the environment.
- The Holy Family – Located in the outdoor sanctuary part of the Shrine, this statue represents family intimacy. It was carved by sculptor, Timothy P. Schmalz and is entitled A Quiet Moment.
- Blessed Father Michael McGivney - founder of the Knights of Columbus, memorial was added in 2012.
- Shrine of Divine Mercy.
- Venerable Bishop Frederic Baraga - first bishop of the Diocese of Marquette.

== Stations of the Cross ==
The Stations of the Cross represent the stages leading up to Jesus' death. They consist of 14 specific events that occurred before Jesus was crucified and later rose from the dead. These 14 events are shown through 14 pictures that represent each moment. They are a way to relive and remember what happened. At the Cross in the Woods Parish, the Stations of the Cross are located outside, incorporated into the pine forest on the Shrine grounds. The main emphasis in this area is a statue of the resurrected Jesus or the fifteenth Station of the Cross.

== Nun Doll Museum ==
"The Nun Doll Museum has the largest collection of dolls dressed in traditional attire of men and women religious communities in the United States." Sally Rogalski began collecting and dressing dolls in traditional attire in 1945. In 1964, she donated 230 dolls with the request that admission never be charged to view the dolls. The collection has grown to 525 dolls and 20 mannequins that represent the Diocesan clergy and more than 217 religious orders. They can be seen in glass display cases located in the lower part of the Long House Chapel.

== See also ==
- Valle de los Caídos, Spain - Location of the largest Cross in the world.
- Roman Catholic Church
- Christianity
