= WTWS =

Coordinates: 44.289°N 84.742°W

- Houghton Lake, Michigan; United States
- Broadcast area
- Frequency: 92.1 MHz
- Branding: 92.1 The Twister

Programming
- Language: English
- Format: Country

Ownership
- Owner: Michael Chires; (Black Diamond Broadcast Group, LLC)

History
- First air date: March 1975 (as WKKM)
- Former call signs: WKKM (1975–2002); WVXH (2002–2006)
- Call sign meaning: TWiSter

Technical information
- Licensing authority: FCC
- Facility ID: 15563
- Class: A
- ERP: 920 watts
- HAAT: 228 meters (748 ft)

Links
- Public license information: Public file; LMS
- Webcast: Listen Live
- Website: ilovethetwister.com

WTWS, known as 92.1 The Twister, is a 920-watt radio station broadcasting at 92.1 FM in Houghton Lake, Michigan, with a country music format.

Formerly licensed to Harrison, Michigan and operated as a satellite of public radio station WVXU Cincinnati for several years and owned by Xavier University (then transferred to Cincinnati Classical Public Radio along with WVXU), the station was formerly owned by Sindy Fuller's Bridge to Bridge, Inc., owner of WUPS 98.5 Houghton Lake, Michigan, and adopted the "Twister" format in June 2006. The two stations were acquired on February 4, 2015 by Black Diamond Broadcast Group, owned by long-time broadcaster Mike Chires, at a purchase price of $1.65 million.

== Early years as WKKM ==
For most of its years, WTWS was known as WKKM, "King of Kountry Music", "The Kountry King" and "The Mighty 92". The station signed on in March 1975 by David Carmine (aka Dave Carr to radio audiences), a former Detroit country radio personality, best known for his stints at WEXL and WOMC. Carmine began his career in 1961 and had aspired to build a station of his own. He moved to Harrison in 1973 and began building the station over the next two years.

For its first few years, WKKM broadcast from a trailer, then from its transmitter building at 550 East Larch Road just outside of Harrison. Eventually the station's studios and offices were moved to 209 East Spruce Street in downtown Harrison.

If WKKM was legendary for anything, it was their low budget presentation. The station used basic voice production instead of jingles. As radio stations started tossing out vinyl in the 1980s for CDs, WKKM didn't fully make the conversion. In the early 1990s, WKKM became almost exclusively a classic country format when record companies decided to stop shipping out records to radio stations; the station instead relied its vast library of 45's.

One of the most obvious indications of WKKM's thriftiness was that during its 27 years on the air, it never broadcast in stereo. According to Carmine, most of the records were in mono as it was, so why bother spending thousands of dollars to convert the station to stereo? Also, Carmine nicknamed the station "The Best Radio Station Radio Shack Ever Built", since it is rumored that parts and hardware for the station came from the electronics retailer.

WKKM was also a fertile training ground for up-and-coming radio talent. Recent graduates of Detroit's Specs Howard School of Media Arts often had their first jobs at WKKM straight out of school before moving on to bigger markets.

== Sister stations: WDEE and WWKM ==
In 1981, Carmine started what would later become an AM simulcast for WKKM, known as WDEE AM 1500, the call letters were taken from a legendary Detroit country station (The Big 'D'), and later given up. Carmine's WDEE, licensed to Reed City, the county seat of nearby Osceola County, and which had no radio station of its own, later became a tool for expanding WKKM's FM signal, which was weak and spotty in that particular area.

Mr. Carmine operated WDEE AM from local studios at 410 W. Upton Ave. (which was then the city of Reed City offices), with local programming for several years, until converting it to the WKKM simulcast in the mid 1980s. The station failed to make any kind of financial inroads for Carmine, and he ended up turning the station off in October 1992, selling WDEE in 1994 to Beilfuss Broadcasting. Beilfuss Broadcasting was a company headed by Cadillac-Traverse City area radio programmer Steve Masters, who operated the station with an oldies format until 1997, when he put WDEE-FM 97.3 on the air and moved his operations south of Reed City to Big Rapids. WDEE, with its weak signal of 250 watts on a high frequency, barely made it ten miles outside its tower, and while off to a good start for Masters, it barely broke even financially. It continued as a simulcast outlet of its FM sister until 2001 when it began a short lived automated classic country format. Masters finally shut it off for good in 2002.

In 1985, Carmine started another AM simulcast for WKKM, WWKM 1540. The station couldn't come at a worse time since AM radio in northern Michigan was good as dead during that period of time. It's well known that WWKM was a waste of money for Carmine, especially since its 1,000-watt daytime only signal only had a roughly 10-mile radius.

During the time that both AM stations were simulcasting WKKM-FM, the positioner/ID voiceover used was "The Mighty 92, WKKM/WWKM FM/AM Harrison, WDEE Reed City". Also heard was "The Country King, WKKM plays more music!" Both were simple voice-over announcements, lacking any sort of jingle packing.

Around 2000, the station had two full-time DJs: Ed Thomas (6 a.m.-1 p.m.) and M. A. Hanson (1-7 p.m.) with a simulcast of Saginaw's WKCQ 98.1 overnights. Up until the simulcast, the station was on the air for only 16 hours a day, signing on at 6:00 AM and signing off at 10:00PM (which was then the FCC minimum standard for commercial FM broadcast hours). The station had a news director, Charlie Cobb. WKKM had a full-service feel to it, as the station had religious programming all day Sunday, plus funeral announcements and Paul Harvey News and Comment. In 2001, the station ditched its WKCQ rebroadcast and played pre-recorded music all night.

Carmine wanted to retire and sold WKKM to Xavier University in 2002 for $270,000. Under the deal, WKKM became a public radio station, WVXH, and simulcast Xavier's X-Star Radio Network, fed from WVXU Cincinnati. Xavier also owned two other stations in northern Michigan: WVXA 96.7 Rogers City, Michigan (now WRGZ) and WVXM 97.7 Manistee, MI (now WMLQ).

== WKKM: Another try at AM ==
WWKM, however, was split off as Laurie Foster, Xavier's manager of northern Michigan stations, bought the station from Carmine for only $10. Foster acquired the WKKM call letters, put them on 1540, and made the station automated classic country. However, the station didn't make a profit and Foster sent the license back to the Federal Communications Commission (FCC), silencing WWKM 1540 forever in 2004.

WKKM was silenced on June 30, 2002 and brought back on as WVXH on July 18. Xavier did extensive work on the station, adding much-needed new equipment. For the first time ever, the station broadcast in stereo. WVXH broadcast X-Star's programs, which included old radio shows, adult standards, jazz, blues and even a rock show Saturday nights.

However, the X-Star Network crumbled. In March 2005, Xavier sold X-Star to Cincinnati Classical Public Radio for $15 million. CCPR wasn't interested in broadcasting outside of Cincinnati, so they put all their stations—WVXH included— on the block. In August, X-Star ceased operations and all of their stations simulcast WVXU full-time.

== Country music returns under a new name ==
In March 2006, it was announced that John Salov—owner of WUPS 98.5 Houghton Lake — was buying WVXH for $200,000, a $70,000 loss for Xavier/CCPR. Although 92.1 is once again a country-music station, it now plays contemporary hit country.

The WWKM call letters were grabbed by WHYT, 88.1/89.1 Imlay City, in 2002 when it became available.

== Move to Houghton Lake ==
As of October 2008, WTWS is broadcasting from new facilities licensed to Houghton Lake, with a power of 920 watts. After sister station WUPS, which primarily targets the Mount Pleasant area, was granted a construction permit to change its city of license to Harrison (with no change in facilities), WTWS received a construction permit to move to Houghton Lake in order that there would still be a radio station licensed to Houghton Lake. From the new facilities, 92.1 FM's signal in the southern part of its former 6,000-watt coverage area, such as Mount Pleasant and Clare, is significantly less strong, but the station can now be heard more clearly in former fringe coverage areas such as Houghton Lake, Higgins Lake, West Branch, St. Helen, and Roscommon, and northward to Grayling. However, a translator station on the same frequency in Gaylord (rebroadcasting Catholic station WTCK in Charlevoix) makes reception more difficult farther north.

== WKKM's brief return ==
In 2008, a new 100-watt FM facility at 90.7 licensed to Harrison was granted the WKKM call letters after they were dropped by an Alpena-area contemporary Christian station that had been using them. This frequency was noted on the air in January 2011 with classic country music in mono, reminiscent of the original WKKM. The licensee was listed as "The Country King, Incorporated" in the FCC database. WKKM was granted its license to cover on August 9, 2011. However, the station's 100-watt signal barely made it out of the Harrison area and did not even reach Clare, giving WKKM a significantly truncated coverage area compared to the old 92.1 signal.

WKKM was sold to West Central Michigan Media Ministries and became WBHL in September 2012, simulcasting the religious programming of WGCP in Cadillac. Under Media Ministries' ownership, 90.7 FM's power has been boosted to 10,000 watts and the station now easily covers all of central Michigan.
