= WCHY =

Coordinates: 45°21′07″N 84°35′38″W

- Cheboygan, Michigan; United States
- Frequency: 97.7 MHz
- Branding: Super Hits 97.7 FM

Programming
- Format: Talk/Oldies

Ownership
- Owner: Michigan Broadcasters LLC

History
- First air date: 2011 (as WQEZ)
- Former call signs: WQEZ (2011–2013); WJZJ (4/2013-5/2013); WOEZ (5/1/2013-5/30/2013); WJZJ (5/2013-6/2013)
- Call sign meaning: From "Cheboygan"

Technical information
- Licensing authority: FCC
- Facility ID: 170939
- Class: C3
- ERP: 3,400 watts
- HAAT: 152 meters (499 ft)

Links
- Public license information: Public file; LMS
- Webcast: Available on website
- Website: wchy.us

WCHY (97.7 FM) is a radio station licensed to Cheboygan, Michigan, United States. The station airs a format consisting of local talk shows and oldies and is currently owned by Michigan Broadcasters LLC. The station previously aired a country music format branded as "Straits Country", which originated on WWSS 95.3 FM in Tuscarora Township and moved to WCHY on March 12, 2018.
