= WUPS =

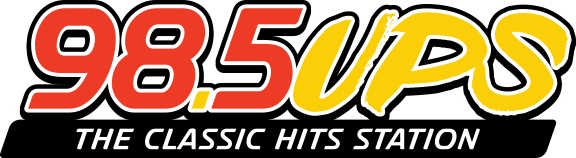
- Harrison, Michigan; United States
- Broadcast area: Northern Michigan
- Frequency: 98.5 MHz
- Branding: 98.5 UPS

Programming
- Format: Classic hits
- Affiliations: Central Michigan Chippewas men's basketball

Ownership
- Owner: Michael Chires; (Black Diamond Broadcast Group, LLC)

History
- First air date: 1961
- Former call signs: WJGS-FM (1961–1988); WHZT (1988)

Technical information
- Licensing authority: FCC
- Facility ID: 49694
- Class: C1
- ERP: 100,000 watts
- HAAT: 299 meters (981 ft)

Links
- Public license information: Public file; LMS
- Webcast: Listen live
- Website: www.wups.com

WUPS (98.5 FM) is a 100 kW radio station licensed to Harrison, Michigan, and serving central and northern Michigan. The station is owned by Black Diamond Broadcast Group, LLC. It broadcasts a classic hits format.

WUPS serves northern and central Michigan, mainly in the Houghton Lake, Harrison, Clare, Mount Pleasant, West Branch, Traverse City, and Midland areas. However, it has a listenable signal north toward Gaylord, south toward Alma and Ithaca, and southeast to Bay City and Saginaw.

WUPS is an official and main Mount Pleasant area affiliate for Central Michigan Chippewas men's basketball.
