= WKNW =

Coordinates: 46°29′18″N 84°19′45″W

- Sault Ste. Marie, Michigan; United States
- Broadcast area: (Daytime) (Nighttime)
- Frequency: 1400 kHz
- Branding: News Talk 1400

Programming
- Format: News/Talk
- Affiliations: Michigan IMG Sports Network; Fox Sports Radio; Premiere Networks

Ownership
- Owner: Sovereign Communications
- Sister stations: AM: WNBY, WSOO; FM: WMKD, WNBY, WSUE, WYSS

History
- First air date: August 25, 1990 (as WDHP)
- Former call signs: WBPW (?-2/5/1990); WDHP (2/5/1990-7/23/1990)
- Call sign meaning: KNoW AM (former branding)

Technical information
- Licensing authority: FCC
- Facility ID: 978
- Class: C
- Power: 1,000 watts day 950 watts night

Links
- Public license information: Public file; LMS
- Webcast: Listen Live
- Website: newstalk1400.net

WKNW (1400 AM) is a news/talk radio station serving Sault Ste. Marie, Michigan and Sault Ste. Marie, Ontario, Canada. The station is the only dedicated privately owned news/talk station in the market, save for its tenure as an ESPN Radio affiliate from 2010 to 2022. According to past editions of the Broadcasting Yearbook, the station went on the air as WKNW in August 1990, after briefly holding the callsigns WBPW and WDHP before launch. The station was popularly known as KNOW AM in the 1990s, which alluded to its news/talk format, and also served as an antonym (in name and frequency) to sister station WYSS' Yes FM branding.

Originally owned by Algoma Broadcasting, WNKW operated as a news/talk station with live Fox Sports Radio coverage from its inception throughout later ownership changes to Marathon Media in 1998, and Northern Star Broadcasting in 2002. The station is currently owned by Sovereign Communications, who acquired the station in 2010.. As of 2010, the station was the Sault Ste. Marie/Newberry market's affiliate for the NASCAR Sprint Cup, and aired such talk programming as First Light and iHeartMedia conservative political shows like The Glenn Beck Program, The Rush Limbaugh Show, and The Sean Hannity Show.

Following the ownership change, WKNW became a full ESPN Radio affiliate, with prior ESPN programming that aired on existing Sovereign AM station WSOO moving to WKNW, and some WKNW talk programs going the other way, notably including Coast to Coast AM and The Handyman Show with Glenn Haege, while Pickford FM affiliate WMKD eventually took over NASCAR rights. On January 5, 2022, WKNW changed their format back to news/talk, branded as "News Talk 1400".

WKNW currently broadcasts conservative news-leaning talk radio programs like The Glenn Beck Program, The Clay Travis and Buck Sexton Show, Wendy Bell Radio, and Steve Gruber in their daytime schedule. Sports remains in WKNW's schedule via programs from Fox Sports Radio in their nighttime rotation. Live sports on WKNW include Detroit Pistons and Lake Superior State Lakers basketball games, as well as Soo Eagles hockey games, and the local sports talk program The Game Sports Show, all of which having aired on the station while still affiliated with ESPN.

In February 2026, the Federal Communications Commission threatened to revoke WKNW and its sister station's licenses due to unpaid annual fees. According to the commission, Sovereign owes $37,250.51 in unpaid fees and has 60 days to respond.

== Sources ==
- Michiguide.com - WKNW History

== Previous logo ==
(Former logo under the "Talk Radio 1400" branding)
