= WYSS =

Radio station in Sault Ste. Marie, Michigan

Coordinates: 46.397°N 84.398°W

- Sault Ste. Marie, Michigan; United States
- Broadcast area: Sault Ste. Marie (MI-ON)
- Frequency: 99.5 MHz
- Branding: "99.5 Yes FM"

Programming
- Format: Top 40 (CHR)
- Affiliations: Compass Media Networks; Premiere Networks; United Stations Radio Networks; Westwood One; Lake Superior State Lakers

Ownership
- Owner: Sovereign Communications
- Sister stations: AM: WKNW, WNBY, WSOO; FM: WMKD, WNBY-FM, WSUE

History
- Former call signs: WSMM (1972-3/1981); WLXX (3/1981-3/1986)
- Call sign meaning: From the "YES-FM" branding

Technical information
- Licensing authority: FCC
- Facility ID: 977
- Class: C1
- ERP: 100,000 watts
- HAAT: 77 meters

Links
- Public license information: Public file; LMS
- Webcast: Listen Live
- Website: yesfm.net

WYSS (99.5 FM) is a radio station broadcasting in Sault Ste. Marie, Michigan. Branded as "99.5 Yes FM," the station has had a Top 40 (CHR) format since 1986. The station's slogans are "Sault Sainte Marie's Hit Music Station" and "All the Hits for Sault Sainte Marie." WYSS is currently by owned Sovereign Communications, who acquired it and fellow Sault stations WKNW and WMKD from Northern Star Broadcasting in 2010.

Programming on WYSS includes The Kidd Kraddick Morning Show, Liveline with Mason weeknights, American Top 40 with Ryan Seacrest, Rick Dees Weekly Top 40 and Open House Party on weekends. WYSS also carries Lake Superior State University Lakers hockey broadcasts, becoming the Lakers' official on-air home in 2009.

== History ==
The station took to the air in July 1972 with 3,000 watts on 92.7 MHz as WSMM, owned by Lock City Broadcasting, becoming the first FM radio station in the Sault Ste. Marie, Michigan market, and the second radio station total based in the city. The station initially programmed a format of MOR and country music. Lock City sold WSMM to Chippewa Broadcasting in 1974, and a few years later the station moved from 92.7 to 99.5 with a dramatic power increase to 26,500 watts. During the late 1970s, the station featured a soft rock format. As WLXX (1981–1986), the station continued with its AC format and eventually added nighttime Top-40 programming, competing with CKCY.

"Yes FM" was born on February 1, 1985, when Delbyco Broadcasting (Del Reynolds and Byron Bordt) purchased WLXX, changed the call letters to WYSS, and initiated a full-time Top-40/contemporary hit radio format in Sault Ste. Marie. In May 1986, Tim Martz Martz Communications Group (d/b/a Algoma Broadcasting) continued the success of "Yes FM", and also brought the talk radio format to the Twin Saults in 1990 with the sign-on of an AM sister station, WKNW, in 1990. Martz sold both WYSS & WKNW to Chicago-based Marathon Media in 1998, which it held for a short while before selling them to Northern Star Broadcasting in 2001. Under Northern Star's ownership, WYSS migrated to a Hot AC format for a time in the 2000s, but has since returned to its previous CHR presentation.

After the February 9, 2010, sale to Sovereign Communications, some positions at the stations were eliminated as part of Sovereign's consolidation of its new and old Sault radio operations (see Infobox); morning host/program director Tim Ellis and John "Johnny G" Gilbert (an original 1985 "Yes FM" staffer) were among those retained by Sovereign and remaining on Yes FM, though both have since departed the station. Additionally, WYSS replaced their popular "Soo Morning Crew" morning drive program with the syndicated Kidd Kraddick Morning Show in March 2010, with many alumni of that program moving on to Paradise classic hits station WUPN in 2012. WYSS' only currently advertised live local DJ is Scott Cook, who is also a popular program host at sister rock station WSUE.

As of June 2020, the station is operating at reduced power of 1,300 watts from a 285-foot tower following a tower collapse in May 2018.

In February 2026, the Federal Communications Commission threatened to revoke WYSS and its sister station's licenses due to unpaid annual fees. According to the commission, Sovereign owes $37,250.51 in unpaid fees and has 60 days to respond.
