= WNBY =

WNBY can refer to:

- WNBY (AM), a radio station (1450 AM) licensed to Newberry, Michigan, United States
- WNBY-FM, a radio station (93.9 FM) licensed to Newberry, Michigan, United States
