= WSUE =

Coordinates: 46.438°N 84.378°W

- Sault Ste. Marie, Michigan; United States
- Broadcast area: Sault Ste. Marie (MI-ON)
- Frequency: 101.3 MHz
- Branding: Rock 101

Programming
- Format: Album-oriented rock (AOR)
- Affiliations: Sault Ste. Marie Greyhounds; Eddie Trunk Rocks; In The Studio

Ownership
- Owner: Sovereign Communications
- Sister stations: AM: WKNW, WNBY, WSOO; FM: WMKD, WNBY-FM, WYSS

History
- First air date: 1978
- Call sign meaning: SUE is a homonym of Sault Ste Marie's nickname ("The Soo") and is similar in theme to sister station WSOO

Technical information
- Facility ID: 20422
- Class: C1
- ERP: 100,000 watts
- HAAT: 67 meters

Links
- Webcast: Listen live
- Website: rock101.net

WSUE (101.3 FM) is a radio station in Sault Ste. Marie, Michigan. Currently owned by Sovereign Communications, the station broadcasts an album-oriented rock (AOR) format with the brand name Rock 101. WSUE features a similar brand identity and playlist as Sovereign Communications' other rock station in the Upper Peninsula, WIMK in Iron Mountain, and since 2010, is the only FM rock radio station directly serving Michigan's Eastern Upper Peninsula and Ontario's Algoma District.

== History ==
WSUE launched in 1978 as a middle of the road station owned by the Miami County Broadcasting Company. The station was sold to Fabiano-Strickler Communications in 1981, who operated it as a country and later adult contemporary station until switching to its current album-oriented rock format in 1989. The station was sold, along with AM sister station WSOO, to Sovereign Communications in 2003.

== Range and programming ==
WSUE is heard in both the Eastern Upper Peninsula and in the Sault Ste. Marie, Ontario market, due to its proximity to Sault Ste. Marie, Michigan. As a result, WSUE covers and advertises bands, concerts, and events in Sault Ste. Marie, Ontario frequently. The station can be heard throughout much of the Central Algoma region of Ontario, and can be heard into the Lower Peninsula of Michigan as far south as Cheboygan, Michigan and surrounding areas. WSUE's local format competitors include CJQM 104.3 FM, and WUPN 95.1 FM. WSUE has had no direct competition with Cheboygan mainstream rock station WGFM, but it does get reception in much of WSUE's coverage area, as do some Northern Lower Michigan classic rock stations like WKLT/WBCM.

WSUE is the current radio home for regular season and playoff games of the Sault Ste. Marie Greyhounds of the Ontario Hockey League, who are based in Sault Ste. Marie, Ontario. Nationally syndicated programming on WSUE includes rock radio programs Eddie Trunk Rocks, In the Studio with Redbeard, and Time Warp with Bill St. James, as well as The Chop Shop and The Core, which are both syndicated from Detroit rock station WRIF. Locally produced programming includes Scott Cook in the Morning on weekday mornings and The Hair Scare (also hosted by Cook) on Saturday nights.

Current on-air talent includes morning host Scott Cook, DJs Allison "Alli J" Miller and Mark SanAngelo, chief meteorologist Karl Bohnak, and Soo Greyhounds announcers Gerry Liscumb, Jr and Lorne "Spanky" Robinson. Pre-recorded bumpers from Nikki "At Night" Peterson (an on-air personality at WUPK and WIMK) and former DJ/producer John Delise are used during the station's nighttime timeslots, while WSOO DJ John Bell provides news reports during Scott Cook in The Morning. Former Sault Ste. Marie City Commissioner Ray Bauer is among WSUE's former DJs, while former Sovereign Communications vice president Tom Ewing was the station's long time news anchor.

In February 2026, the Federal Communications Commission threatened to revoke WSUE and its sister station's licenses due to unpaid annual fees. According to the commission, Sovereign owes $37,250.51 in unpaid fees and has 60 days to respond.

== Sources ==
- Michiguide.com - WSUE History
