= WUPN =

WUPN may refer to:

- WUPN (FM), a radio station (95.1 FM) licensed to serve Paradise, Michigan, United States
- WMYV in Greensboro, North Carolina, a TV station formerly affiliated with UPN, used "WUPN" as its calls from 1996 to 2006
- WPNY-LD in Utica, New York, a TV station formerly affiliated with UPN, used "WUPN-LP" as its calls from 1995 to 1996
- WSEN (FM) in Mexico, New York, a religious radio station, used "WUPN" as its calls from 1995 to 1996
