= Roman Catholic Diocese of Sault Sainte Marie =

Roman Catholic Diocese of Sault Sainte Marie may refer to:

- Roman Catholic Diocese of Sault Sainte Marie, Michigan, a titular see in Michigan, United States
- Roman Catholic Diocese of Sault Sainte Marie, Ontario, an active suffragan diocese in Ontario, Canada
