= WSOO =

Coordinates: 46°26′16″N 84°22′42″W

- Sault Ste. Marie, Michigan; United States
- Broadcast area
- Frequency: 1230 kHz
- Branding: 1230 WSOO

Programming
- Format: Soft AC/talk
- Affiliations: ABC News Radio; ESPN Radio; Michigan Radio Network; Detroit Red Wings; Detroit Tigers; Coast to Coast AM

Ownership
- Owner: Sovereign Communications
- Sister stations: AM: WKNW, WNBY; FM: WMKD, WNBY-FM, WSUE, WYSS

History
- First air date: June 25, 1940
- Call sign meaning: The Soo

Technical information
- Licensing authority: FCC
- Facility ID: 20420
- Class: C
- Power: 1,000 watts

Links
- Public license information: Public file; LMS
- Webcast: Listen live
- Website: 1230wsoo.com

WSOO (1230 AM) is a radio station in Sault Ste. Marie, Michigan. The station airs a gold-based soft adult contemporary format during daytime hours, featuring music from the 1960s through the 2000s, and features paranormal talk programming in late night timeslots. WSOO has been owned and operated by Sovereign Communications since 2003, and is part of Sovereign's seven-station cluster in the Sault Ste. Marie and Newberry market (see Infobox).

Broadcasting since June 25, 1940, WSOO is the first radio station to broadcast in the Sault Ste. Marie, Michigan radio market, and was only preceded in the region by the now-closed Sault Ste. Marie, Ontario AM station CFYN (formerly CJIC.) The station was launched and owned by the Hiawathaland Broadcasting Company, who later shifted the station to a middle of the road format in the late 1960s, prior to selling the station to Patterson Communications (later the Miami County Broadcasting Company) in 1971, as owned by Richard E. Hunt, who also owned WCBY AM and -FM in Cheboygan and WPTW AM & -FM in his hometown of Piqua, Ohio. WSOO was purchased by Fabiano-Strickler Communications in 1981, who shifted to its current adult contemporary/talk format in 1989. The station was ultimately purchased by current owners Sovereign Communications in 2003.

Live sports coverage on WSOO includes Detroit Red Wings, Detroit Tigers, and Sault High Blue Devils games, as well as the regional high school sports talk show Coach's Corner, and annual coverage of the International 500 snowmobile race in Sault Ste. Marie. Syndicated talk programs include the late-night paranormal programs Ground Zero and Coast to Coast AM, while the station also airs the Sunday morning Baptist televangelist program Good News From The Good Book with Pastor Tim Rader, out of nearby Kinross, Michigan. The Handyman Show with Glenn Haege previously aired on WSOO on Sundays until Haege's passing in September 2017. As well, the station features hourly newsbreaks from ABC News Radio.

Local on-air personalities at WSOO include morning host Allan Gibbs, DJ/news anchor John Bell, sports anchor Mark SanAngelo, chief meteorologist Karl Bohnak, and Sault High Blue Devils play-by-play announcer and Coach's Corner host Dave Watson.

In February 2026, the Federal Communications Commission threatened to revoke WSOO and its sister station's licenses due to unpaid annual fees. According to the commission, Sovereign owes $37,250.51 in unpaid fees and has 60 days to respond.
