= Sovereign Communications =

American radio company

Sovereign Communications, LLC is an American radio broadcasting company which owns seven radio stations in the Upper Peninsula of Michigan, with offices in Sault Ste. Marie, Michigan. The company is owned and operated by William C. Gleich and Tim Sabean.

After their February 2010 purchase of 11 stations from Northern Star Broadcasting, the company holds "something close to a local monopoly" on radio stations in the Sault Ste. Marie region. The transaction was publicly valued at $3,425,000 in cash. Several Northern Star employees (both on-air and in management) lost their jobs as a result of the purchase. As well, 97.9 WIHC out of Newberry, Michigan went dark that same month after not being purchased from Northern Star in the deal, only returning two years later under new ownership. At present, Sovereign Communications owns every locally produced, non-simulcasted FM station in the Sault Ste. Marie, Michigan market, except for the two classic hits stations owned by Darby Advertising under their "Radio Eagle" format (WUPN & WMJT).

In May 2007, the company started the WSOO Scholarship, available to a student at Lake Superior State University with a "demonstrated interest and involvement in communication". To qualify for the scholarship, the student must be a resident of the eastern Upper Peninsula of Michigan, and preference is given to applicants who graduated from a Chippewa County high school. The WSOO scholarship covers "full tuition and required fees" at the university for one year.

In February 2026, the FCC entered an order requiring Sovereign to pay some $37,000 in overdue regulatory fees and penalties, or face suspension of its station licenses within 60 days.

== Radio stations ==
=== Sault Ste. Marie, MI ===
- 1230 WSOO Full service
- 1400 WKNW ESPN/Sports
- 99.5 WYSS Contemporary Hits
- 101.3 WSUE Rock
- 105.5 WMKD Country

=== Newberry, MI ===
- 1450 WNBY Classic Country
- 93.9 WNBY-FM Classic Hits
