= Tower of History =

Observation tower and museum in Sault Ste. Marie, Michigan, USA

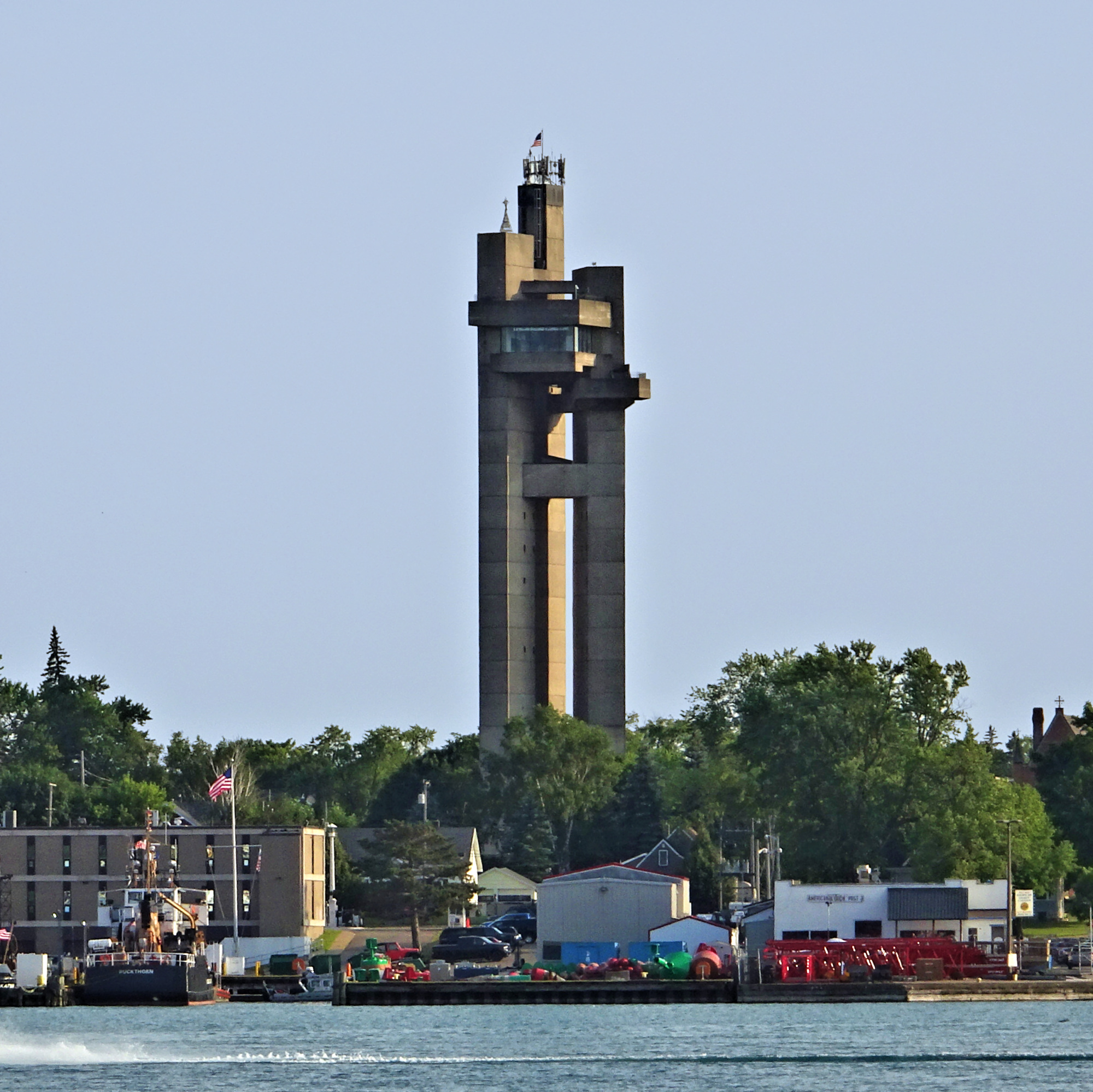
- Tower of History in 2021

- Location within Michigan Location within the United States
- Former names: Tower of Missionaries

General information
- Type: Observation tower
- Architectural style: Modern architecture
- Location: 326 E. Portage Avenue, Sault Ste. Marie, Michigan, US
- Coordinates: 46.4982°N 84.3405°W
- Completed: 1968
- Cost: $1 million
- Owner: Le Sault De Sainte Marie Historical Sites, Inc.

Height
- Height: 210 ft (64 m)

Technical details
- Material: Glass, steel, and reinforced concrete
- Floor count: 21
- Lifts/elevators: 1

Design and construction
- Architect: George Rafferty
- Architecture firm: Progressive Design Associates, Saint Paul, Minnesota
- Developer: St. Mary's Catholic Church

Website
- www.saulthistoricsites.com/tower-of-history/

The Tower of History (originally the Tower of Missionaries) is a 210-foot (64 m) observation tower in Sault Ste. Marie, Michigan. Located at 326 E. Portage Avenue, it was the tallest observation tower in the Upper Peninsula of Michigan when completed in 1968. The tower was built in a modernist style and consists of three vertical, trapezoid-shaped columns that support five cantilevered observation platforms. It provides a panoramic, 360-degree view of the Soo Locks, the St. Mary's River, Lake Superior, and cities on both the American and Canadian sides of the border. The view extends for roughly 20 miles (32 km); in total, approximately 1,200 square miles (3,100 km^{2}) are visible from the tower.

== History ==
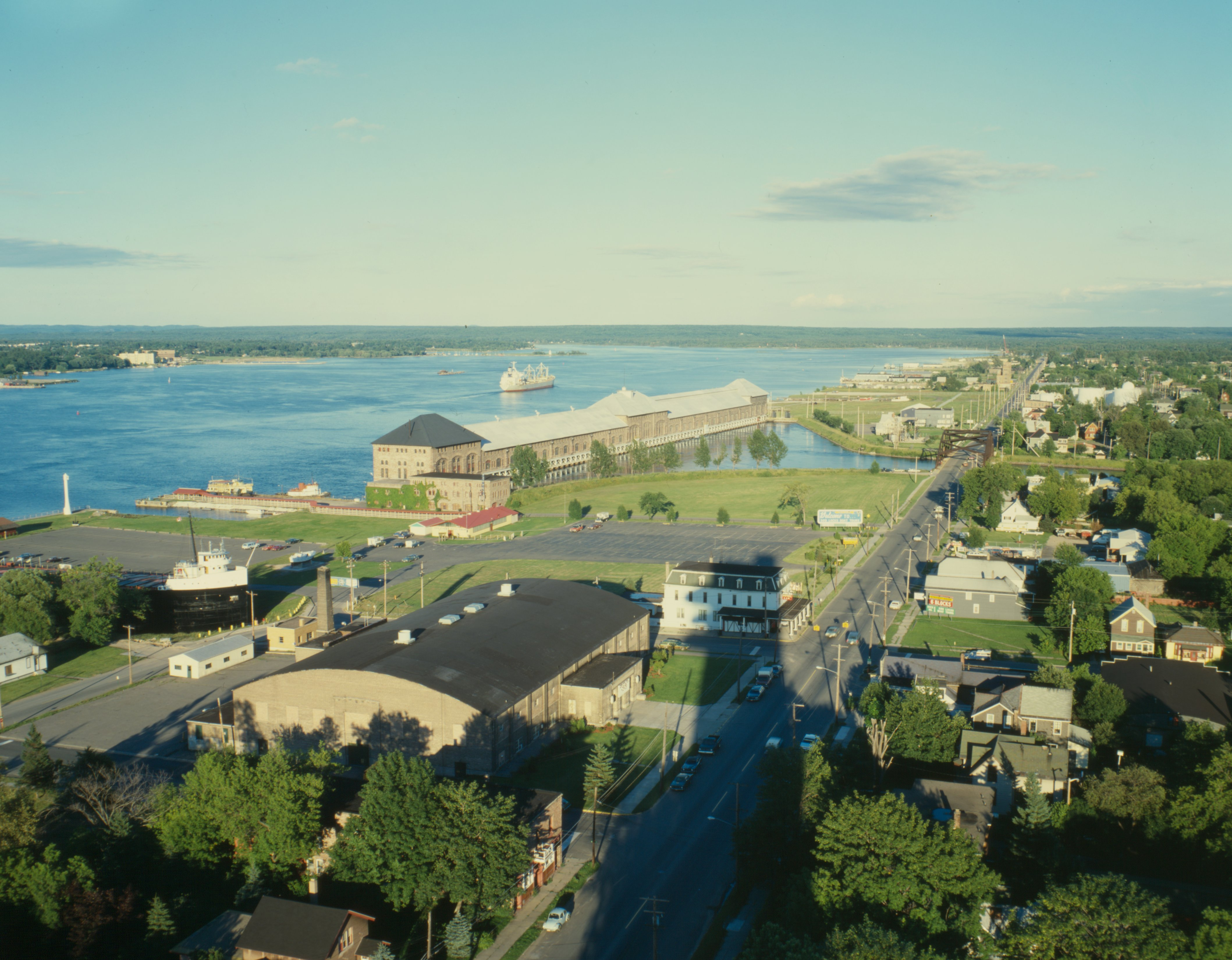
View from the Tower of History, 1978

The Tower of History was built in 1968 by St. Mary's Catholic Church as part of a never-completed shrine to Catholic missionaries active in the Upper Peninsula that was to be named the Shrine of the Missionaries. It was designed by George Rafferty of Saint Paul, Minnesota-based Progressive Design Associates, while Frank Kacmarcik served as the project's art consultant. The tower was built on the site of Jacques Marquette's first log house and chapel. It was initially estimated to cost just $50,000 to build, although this figure soon ballooned to over $600,000 once recommendations from the project's architect and consultants were factored in; ultimately, the total cost rose to nearly $1 million.

The tower was planned to be complemented by a new church building and community center, although St. Mary's ultimately ended funding for the project. From the beginning, it was conceived as both a historical and a tourist attraction. The tower was originally intended to house a museum to 17th- and 18th-century missionaries as well as be connected to the planned new church building, effectively functioning as its steeple. Initially called the Tower of Missionaries, it was renamed the Tower of History to broaden its appeal to visitors. The tower was initially projected to cover its costs by visitors paying $1 or $2 to experience the view from the observation platforms, but according to parishioner and building committee member Paul Ripley, the unforeseen oil crisis precluded the tourism growth that they expected.

In 1971, due to the financial problems that St. Mary's was enduring, the Roman Catholic Diocese of Marquette assumed responsibility for the tower. In 1972, its operation was reorganized and it became directed by a state-wide board of directors. Also at that time, the tower employed 10 college students as workers. By 1975, it was attracting over 40,000 visitors a year. In 1979, an advisory board to the Diocese of Marquette's administrative board recommended either closing the tower or donating it to a civic organization. In 1980, the diocese donated it to Le Sault De Sainte Marie Historical Sites, Inc. (Sault Historic Sites).

The Tower of History includes museum exhibits about Catholic missionaries, local history, and Native American history. The museum exhibits and a video presentation are located on the tower's Lower Level, while three separate viewing platforms (both open-air and glassed-in) and additional exhibit space are located on the Upper Level. The tower features an express elevator that ascends to the viewing platforms in 45 seconds. The Tower of History is open to the public between mid-May and mid-October.
