= Holy Name of Mary Pro-Cathedral (Sault Ste. Marie, Michigan) =

Historic church in Michigan, United States

- Holy Name of Mary Proto-Cathedral
- U.S. National Register of Historic Places
- Michigan State Historic Site
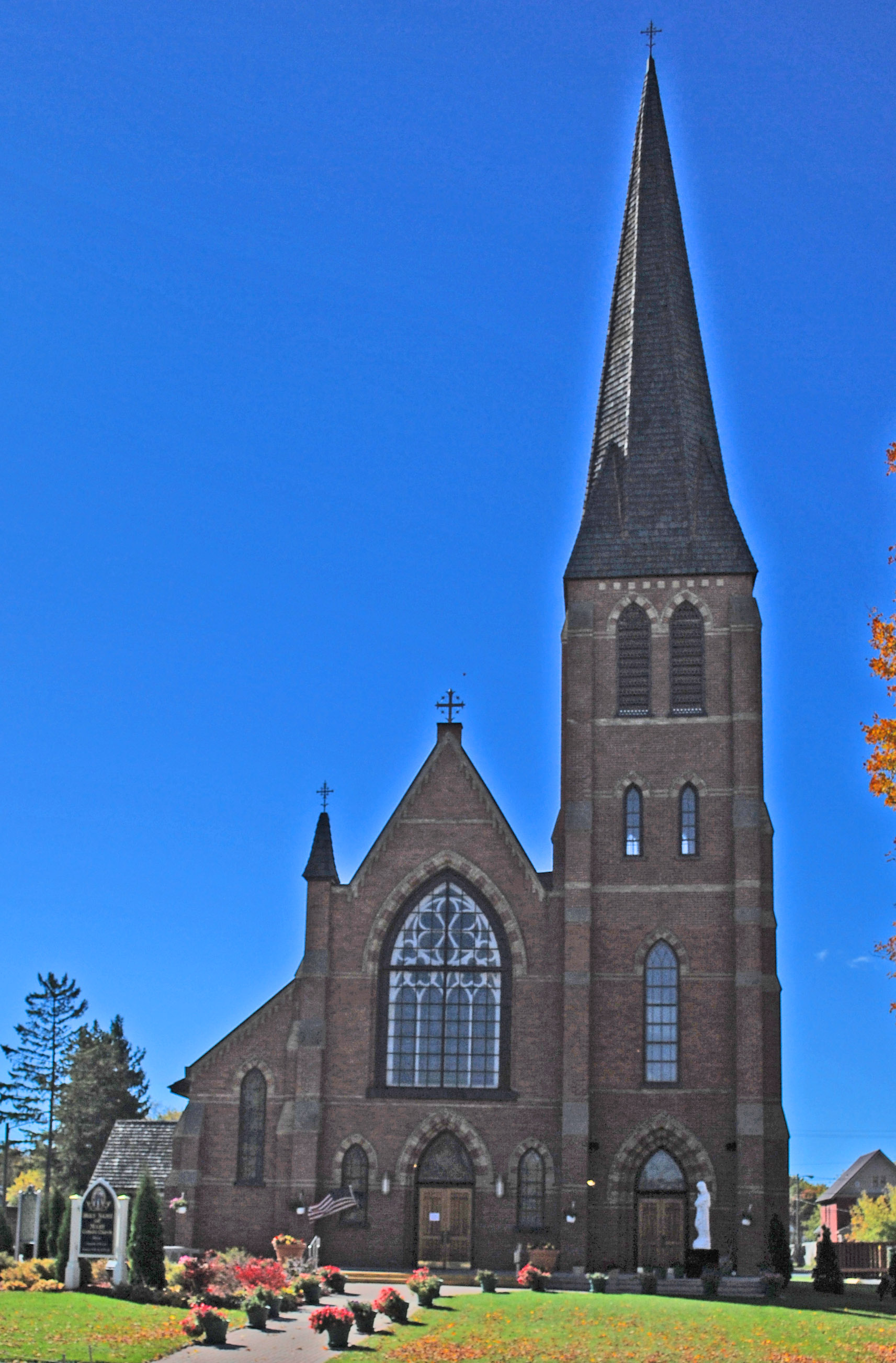

- Location within Michigan Location within the United States
- Interactive map
- Location: 320 East Portage Avenue; Sault Ste. Marie, Michigan
- Coordinates: 46°29′55″N 84°20′29″W
- Built: 1881
- Architect: Joseph Connolly
- Architectural style: Gothic Revival
- NRHP reference No.: 84000540

Significant dates
- Added to NRHP: December 27, 1984
- Designated MSHS: July 20, 1989

Holy Name of Mary Proto-Cathedral, also known as St. Mary Proto-Cathedral, is a historic Catholic parish church in Sault Ste. Marie, Michigan, that was formerly the first cathedral of the Diocese of Marquette. It is the oldest parish and oldest cathedral in Michigan, and the third-oldest parish in the United States (after those in St. Augustine, Florida and Santa Fe, New Mexico).

While the present church edifice, the fifth for the parish, dates from 1881, the parish began in 1668 as a Jesuit mission. It was listed on the National Register of Historic Places in 1984 and designated a State of Michigan historic site in 1989. The church was also the first cathedral of the Diocese of Marquette's predecessor, the Diocese of Sault Sainte Marie.

== History ==
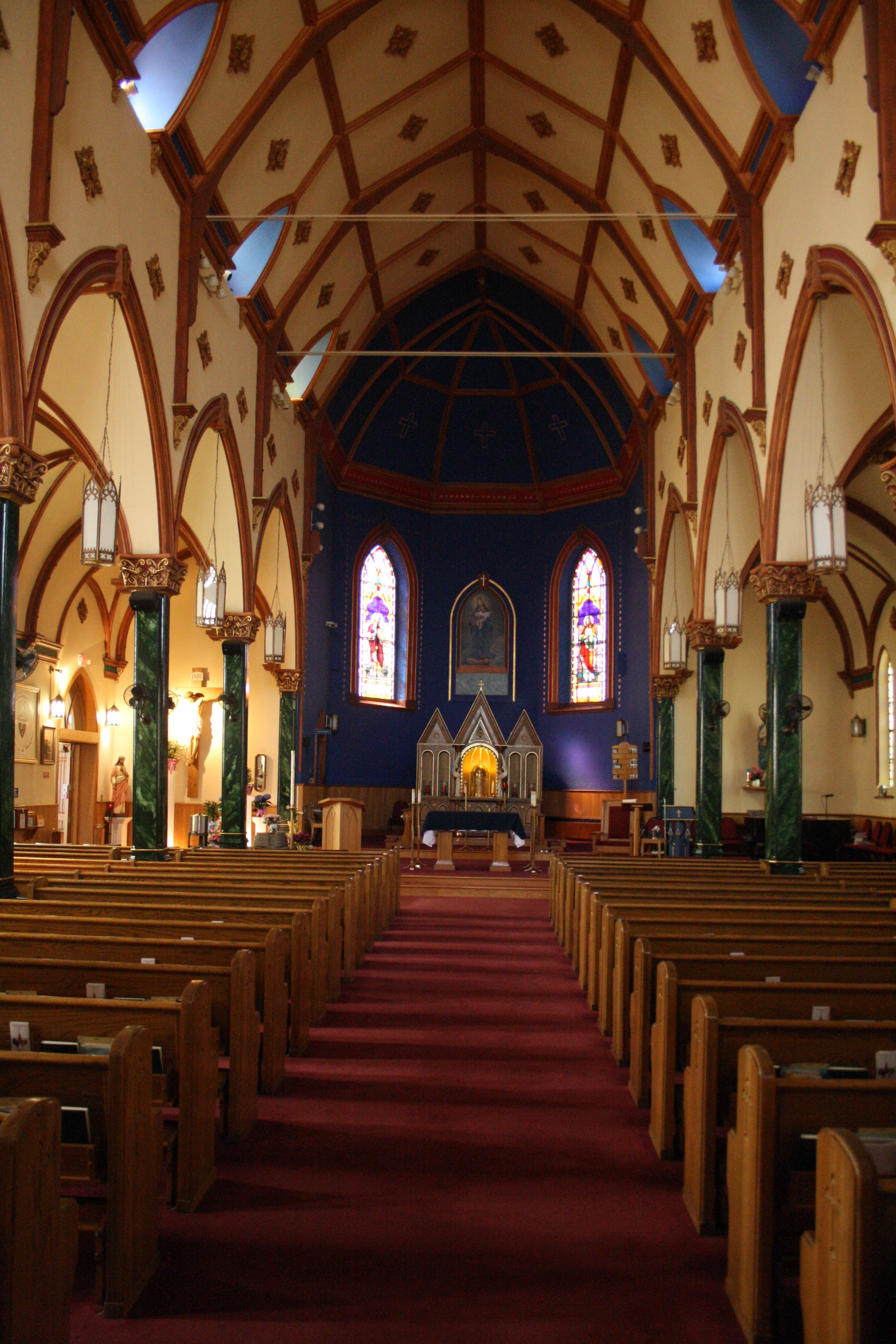
Church interior

Holy Name of Mary was begun by Jesuits in 1668. On January 9, 1857, Bl. Pope Pius IX erected the Diocese of Sault Ste. Marie and the church was named the cathedral church of the new diocese, being the first cathedral in the Upper Peninsula of Michigan. It was the first parish and first cathedral in Michigan, and the third parish in the United States (after those in St. Augustine, Florida and Santa Fe, New Mexico).

Fr Frederic Baraga became the first bishop of the New diocese. In 1865, the Diocese of Sault Ste. Marie became the Diocese of Marquette and St. Peter Cathedral in Marquette became the cathedral.

The present church, the fifth for the parish, was erected in 1881. Canadian architect Joseph Connolly designed it in the Gothic Revival style. The church was extensively remodeled in three phases from the mid-1980s to the mid-1990s. The present rectory was added in 1922.

In 1968 the parish erected the Tower of History as a shrine to the Catholic missionaries who served the community. It was designed to be a part of a larger complex that was to include a community center and a new church edifice. Parish priorities changed and the structure was sold to Sault Historic Sites in 1980, which continues to operate it. Proceeds from the Tower of History still benefit the church.

== Catholic schools ==
St. Mary's School was opened 1885. The Sisters of Loretto opened Loretto Academy in 1896 and educated girls from grade school through high school. It became a co-educational high school in 1945. The present school building was built in 1937 and held classes through eighth grade. Both St. Mary's School and Loretto Academy closed in 1971 for financial reasons. The academy building was sold to the local school district. St. Mary's School re-opened in 1993 and serves students from preschool through eighth grade.

== See also ==
- List of Catholic cathedrals in the United States
- List of cathedrals in the United States
- List of Jesuit sites
