= WNBY-FM =

Coordinates: 46.449°N 85.101°W

- Newberry, Michigan; United States
- Broadcast area: Sault Ste. Marie, Michigan
- Frequency: 93.9 MHz
- Branding: Oldies 93

Programming
- Format: Classic hits/Oldies
- Affiliations: Detroit Lions Radio Network; Classic Countdown

Ownership
- Owner: Sovereign Communications
- Sister stations: AM: WKNW, WNBY, WSOO; FM: WMKD, WSUE, WYSS

History
- First air date: 1977
- Call sign meaning: NewBerrY

Technical information
- Licensing authority: FCC
- Facility ID: 20379
- Class: C2
- ERP: 50,000 watts
- HAAT: 135 meters

Links
- Public license information: Public file; LMS
- Webcast: Listen Live
- Website: oldies93fm.com

WNBY-FM (93.9 MHz, "Oldies 93") is a classic hits/oldies music formatted radio station licensed to Newberry, Michigan, and serving the Sault Ste. Marie market. The station is owned and operated by Sovereign Communications. The station shares a call sign and ownership history with Newberry AM station WNBY 1450, which broadcasts a classic country format.

WNBY has operated on different frequencies over the years, starting on 93.5 MHz, then 93.7 MHz, and finally to its current frequency of 93.9 MHz in 2004. For many years, WNBY-FM was a typical small-town full-service radio station, primarily serving Newberry and Luce County with a mixture of adult contemporary, country and oldies music plus local news and sports.

At the time of the station's move from 93.7 to 93.9 (along with a transmitter move eastward from Luce County into Chippewa County, north of Eckerman), WNBY-FM's format changed from adult contemporary to a 1960s and 1970s oldies format targeted primarily at Sault Ste. Marie, though the station retains offices in Newberry. The format change returned the Oldies format to the air in the Sault market, which had been without an oldies station since the end of the former "Memories 105.5" WADW (now WMKD). WNBY-FM's current 50,000-watt signal allows the station to be heard throughout the eastern Upper Peninsula, Algoma District in Ontario, Canada, and far northern portions of the Lower Peninsula. "Oldies 93" began as a traditional oldies station playing hit music from the 1950s through the 1970s, but has evolved toward more of a classic hits direction as of the summer of 2012, dropping pre-Beatles music and adding many 1980s titles to its playlist. Oldies 93 temporarily drops its regular format for continuous Christmas music between Thanksgiving and Christmas each year, the only station in the Sault Ste. Marie area to do so.

Local on-air personalities at WNBY-FM include DJs Allison "Alli J" Miller", Allan Gibbs, Travis Freeman, Lydia McNiece, James Warner-Smith and Mark SanAngelo, program host Lou Turco, and chief meteorologist Karl Bohnak. WNBY is a member of the Detroit Lions Radio Network and broadcasts all Detroit Lions NFL games to the Sault Ste. Marie radio market. The station runs syndicated radio shows hosted by Dick Bartley on weekends, including Dick Bartley's Classic Hits on Saturday nights and encore presentations of Casey Kasem's American Top 40: The 70s on Sunday mornings and The 80s on Saturday mornings. Locally produced programming includes The Weekend Club with Lou Turco on Saturday mornings and The Good Buy Shopping Hour on Wednesday mornings. WNBY-FM broadcasts high school basketball games from the Eastern Upper Peninsula Conference, and has also simulcasted select playoff games from the Sault Ste. Marie Greyhounds OHL hockey team in the past.

In February 2026, the Federal Communications Commission threatened to revoke WNBY and its sister station's licenses due to unpaid annual fees. According to the commission, Sovereign owes $37,250.51 in unpaid fees and has 60 days to respond.

== Sources ==
- Michiguide.com - WNBY-FM History
