= Roman Catholic Diocese of Sault Sainte Marie–Marquette =

Former Roman Catholic diocese in Michigan, USA

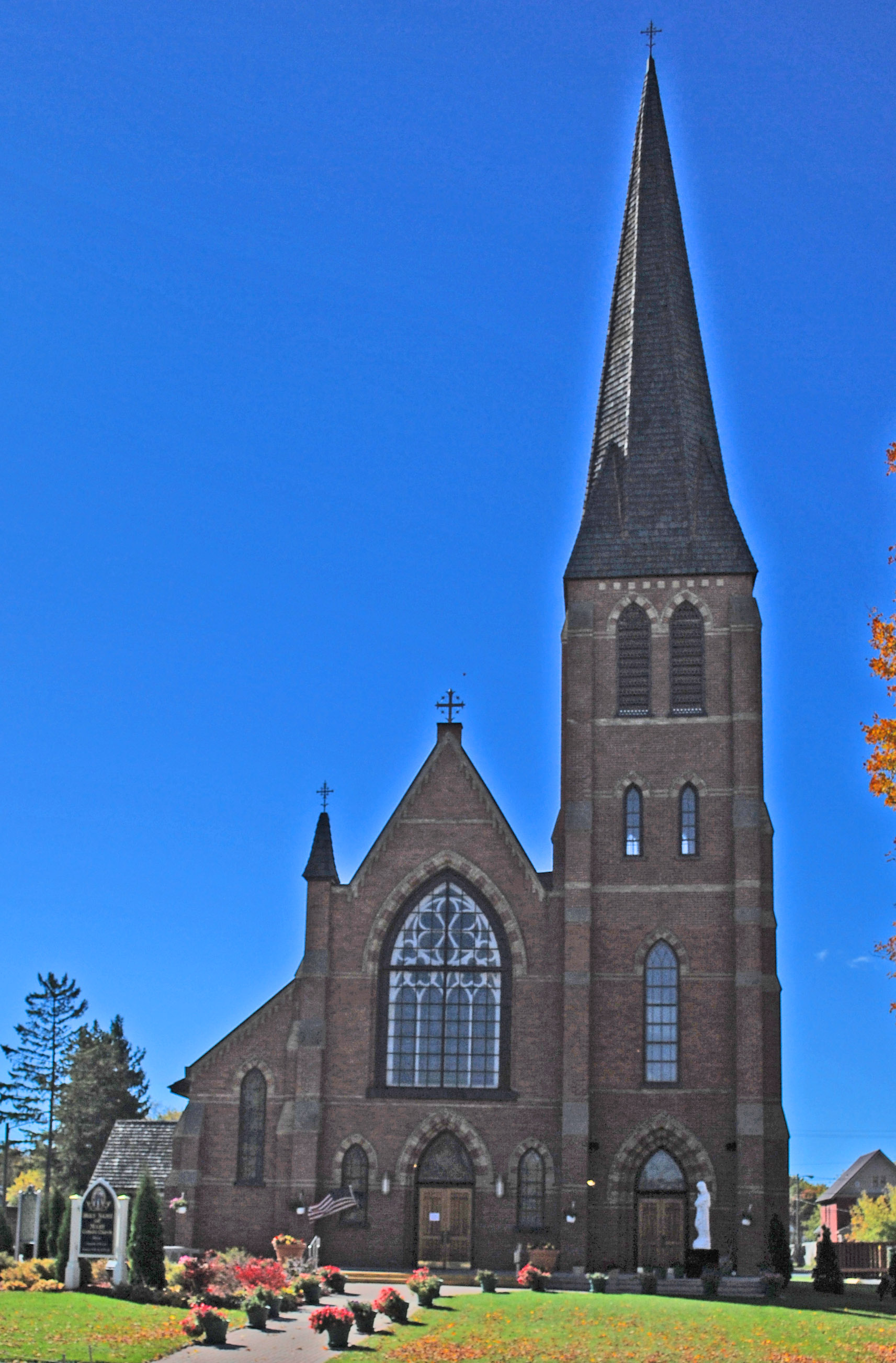
Holy Name of Mary

The Diocese of Sault Sainte Marie-Marquette was, until 1937, a diocese of the Latin Church in northern Michigan. Today it is a titular see known as the Diocese of Sault Sainte Marie in Michigan (Latin: Dioecesis Marianopolitana in Michigania).

As with other titular sees, the Diocese of Sault Sainte Marie no longer functions and is considered by the Vatican as a dead diocese. The current titular bishop is Auxiliary Bishop Francis J. Kane of the Archdiocese of Chicago.

== History ==
On July 29, 1853, the Vatican established the Apostolic Vicariate of Upper Michigan. Comprising territory from the Diocese of Detroit in northern Michigan, the vicariate was headquartered in Sault Ste. Marie. Holy Name of Mary Church in Sault Ste. Marie was the cathedral church.

The Vatican elevated the apostolic vicariate on January 9, 1857, to the Diocese of Sault Sainte Marie. On October 23, 1865, the vicariate was renamed the Diocese of Sault Sainte Marie-Marquette and the Vatican named the Venerable Frederic Baraga as its first bishop. The Vatican formally suppressed the diocese on January 3, 1937, reassigning its territory and its Bishop to the new Diocese of Marquette. The new see city was Marquette, Michigan.

== Residential bishops ==
=== Apostolic Vicar of Upper Michigan ===
- Venerable Frederic Baraga (term July 29, 1853 – January 9, 1857)

=== Bishop of Sault Sainte Marie ===
- Venerable Frederic Baraga (term January 9, 1857 – October 23, 1865)

=== Bishops of Sault Sainte Marie-Marquette ===
- Venerable Frederic Baraga (term October 23, 1865– January 19, 1868)
- Ignatius Mrak (term September 25, 1868 – April 28, 1879)
- John Vertin (tern May 16, 1879 – February 26, 1899)
- Frederick Eis (term June 7, 1899 – July 8, 1922)
- Paul Joseph Nussbaum, CP (term November 14, 1922 – June 24, 1935)
- Joseph Casimir Plagens (term November 16, 1935 – January 3, 1937)

== Titular see ==
The Vatican restored the Diocese of Sault Saint Marie-Marquette in 1995 as a titular bishopric under the name "Titular See of Sault Sainte Marie". In 1996, it was renamed the "Titular See of Sault Sainte Marie in Michigan". Its titular bishops include:

- Archbishop Allen Henry Vigneron (term June 12, 1996 – January 10, 2003)
- Bishop Francis J. Kane (term January 24, 2003 – present)

== See also ==
- Alphabetical list of Catholic titular sees

== Source and External links ==
- GCatholic with incumbent bio links
