= Soo Theatre =

Historic theatre in Sault Ste. Marie, Michigan

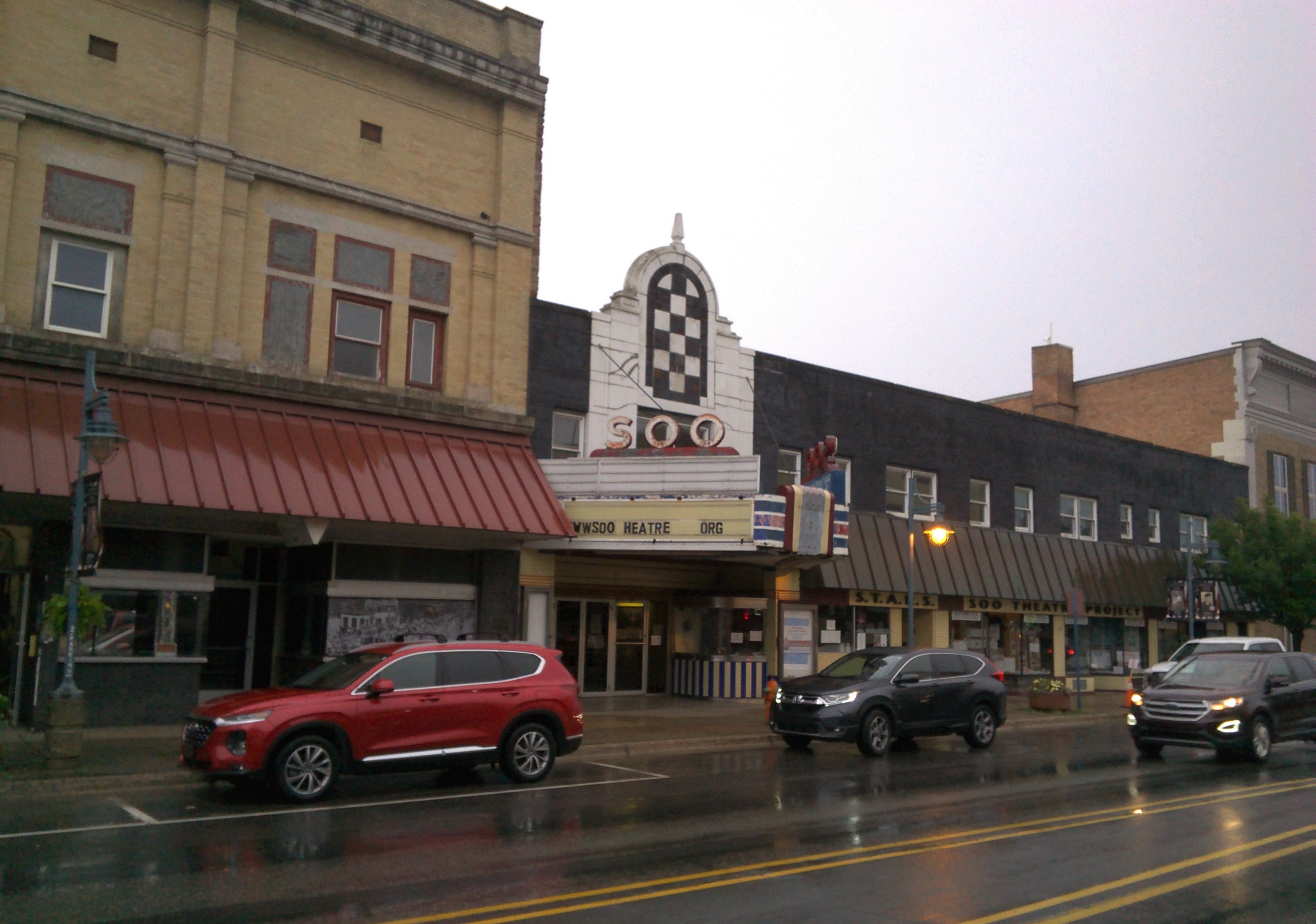
- The Soo Theatre in 2021
- Interactive map of Soo Theatre
- Address: 534 Ashmun Street
- Location: Sault Ste. Marie, Michigan, U.S.
- Coordinates: region:US-MI 46.49664°N 84.34859°W
- Owner: Soo Theatre Project, Inc.
- Capacity: 1,185 (as built)
- Type: Movie and performing arts theatre

Construction
- Opened: March 12, 1930
- Architect: William P. Whitney

Website
- www.sootheatre.org

The Soo Theatre is a historic theatre at 534 Ashmun Street in Sault Ste. Marie, Michigan, United States. Opened in 1930 as a movie and live-performance house, it operated as a cinema until 1998 and, since 2003, has been owned and operated by the nonprofit Soo Theatre Project, Inc. as a regional center for the performing arts and arts education.

== History ==
The Soo Theatre opened on March 12, 1930, built by Butterfield Michigan Theatres as the chain's 85th theatre. It was designed by Chicago architect William P. Whitney, with interior design by E. R. Nickel of United Studios, and was constructed in about six months by builder M. N. Hunt. The building combined a large auditorium with four street-level storefronts and nine upstairs apartments. As built, the auditorium seated 1,185 and had a stage 88 feet (27 m) wide and 24 feet (7.3 m) deep, allowing full stage productions in addition to films.

The theatre presented both films and live entertainment, including vaudeville, into the 1940s. In 1974 the auditorium was divided by a concrete wall and "twinned" into a two-screen cinema, and the stage went dark. The movie theatre closed in 1998 and the building stood vacant until 2003.

== Soo Theatre Project ==
In March 2003, the nonprofit Soo Theatre Project, Inc. purchased the building to renovate and restore it as a regional arts center. The organization obtained nonprofit status and a State of Michigan Cool Cities grant in 2004, converted four former storefronts into music studios, and launched an arts-education program. In 2005 the concrete wall dividing the auditorium was removed, and in August 2005 the theatre presented its first live performance in about 30 years, an original play marking the Soo Locks sesquicentennial. When the nearby Mackinac Crossings Theatre closed in 2006, the Soo Theatre acquired its seats, stage rigging, lighting, and sound equipment, which volunteers installed beginning in 2007.

Restoration has continued in phases. Between 2017 and 2018 most of the building's roofs were replaced under a "Raise the Roof" campaign supported by a Michigan Arts and Culture Council grant, and stage rigging, wiring, and sound and lighting systems have been upgraded over time. An exterior restoration, carried out from 2021 and completed in 2024 at a cost of about $600,000, removed later additions, restored the original brick and limestone façade, and included a reproduction of the theatre's 1940 marquee, installed in 2023. Because the auditorium has limited heating and insulation, the performance season runs from April through early December, while education programs operate year-round; more than 400 students took part in classes, lessons, and summer camps in 2024.

The theatre's stage has hosted youth and adult theatre, opera, and orchestral programs, and since 2014 its auditorium has served as a venue for the annual Soo Film Festival. It has been described as one of the few historic theatres remaining in Michigan's Upper Peninsula.
