= Joseph K. Lumsden Bahweting Anishnabe School =

Tribal school in Sault Ste. Marie, Michigan, US

Coordinates: 46.4814°N 84.3317°W

Joseph K. Lumsden Bahweting Anishnabe School is a Bureau of Indian Education (BIE)-affiliated tribal school and an affiliated charter school in Sault Ste. Marie, Michigan. It is a K-8 school.

== History ==
The school, originally a private school and named simply Bahweting Anishnabe School, opened in fall 1994. Its original enrollment was 135. Money generated from casinos was used to fund the school's establishment. The school board was assembled in October 1994.

Northern Michigan University began chartering the school in 1995. By then the number of employees and students had increased. It received its current name in 1998.

By 2004 the school had 270 students. By then it had won the National Blue Ribbon Schools Program's award one time. According to Brenda Wade Schmidt of the Argus Leader, the school had a better academic reputation than other area schools and other American tribal schools. The school collected data on how students learned material related to the State of Michigan's performance standards.

== Demographics ==
Circa 2004 the percentage of students who were classified as economically disadvantaged was almost 60.

== Curriculum ==
The curriculum includes indigenous culture.
