= Sault Ste. Marie, Michigan =

- City
- City of Sault Ste. Marie
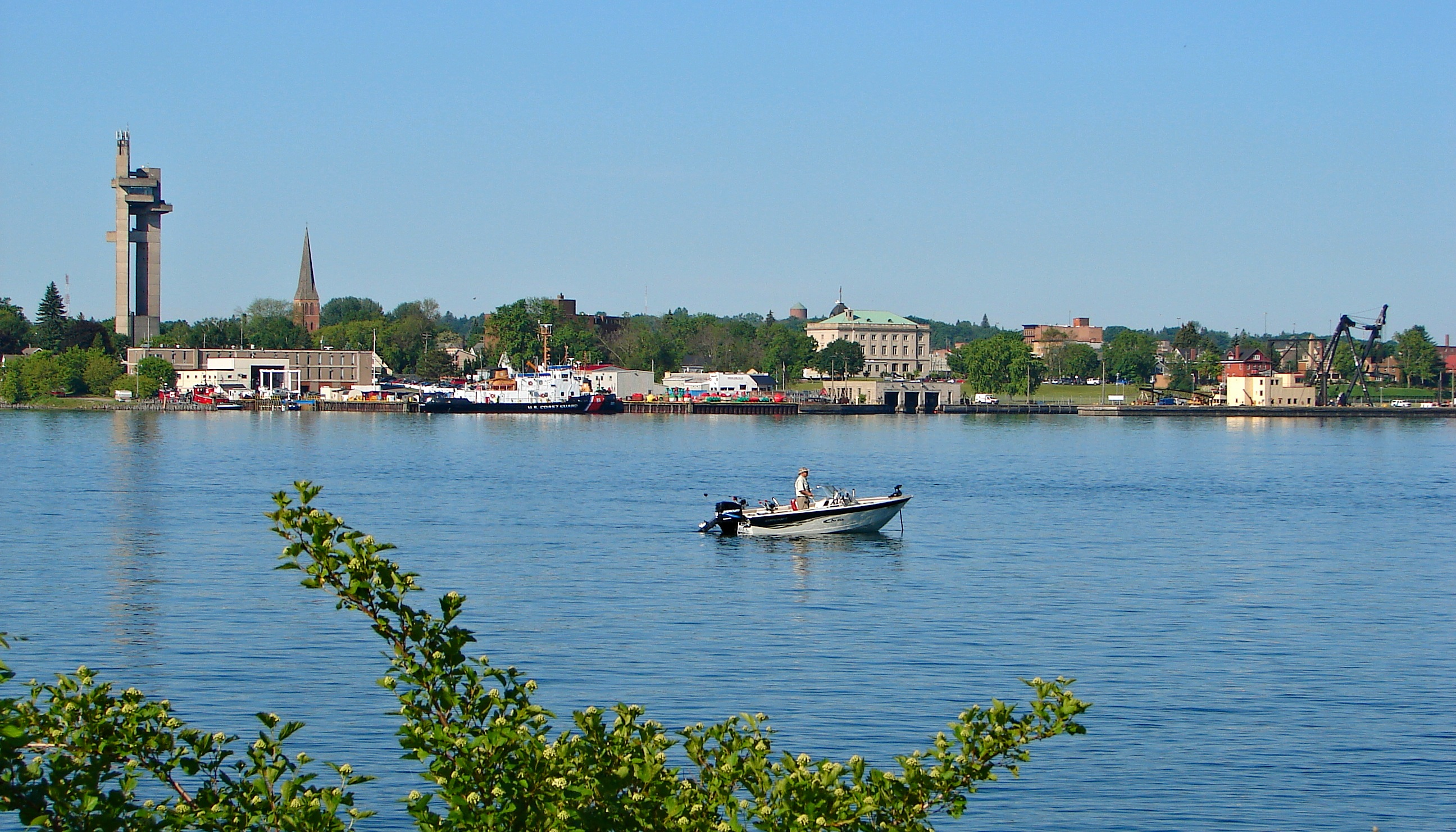
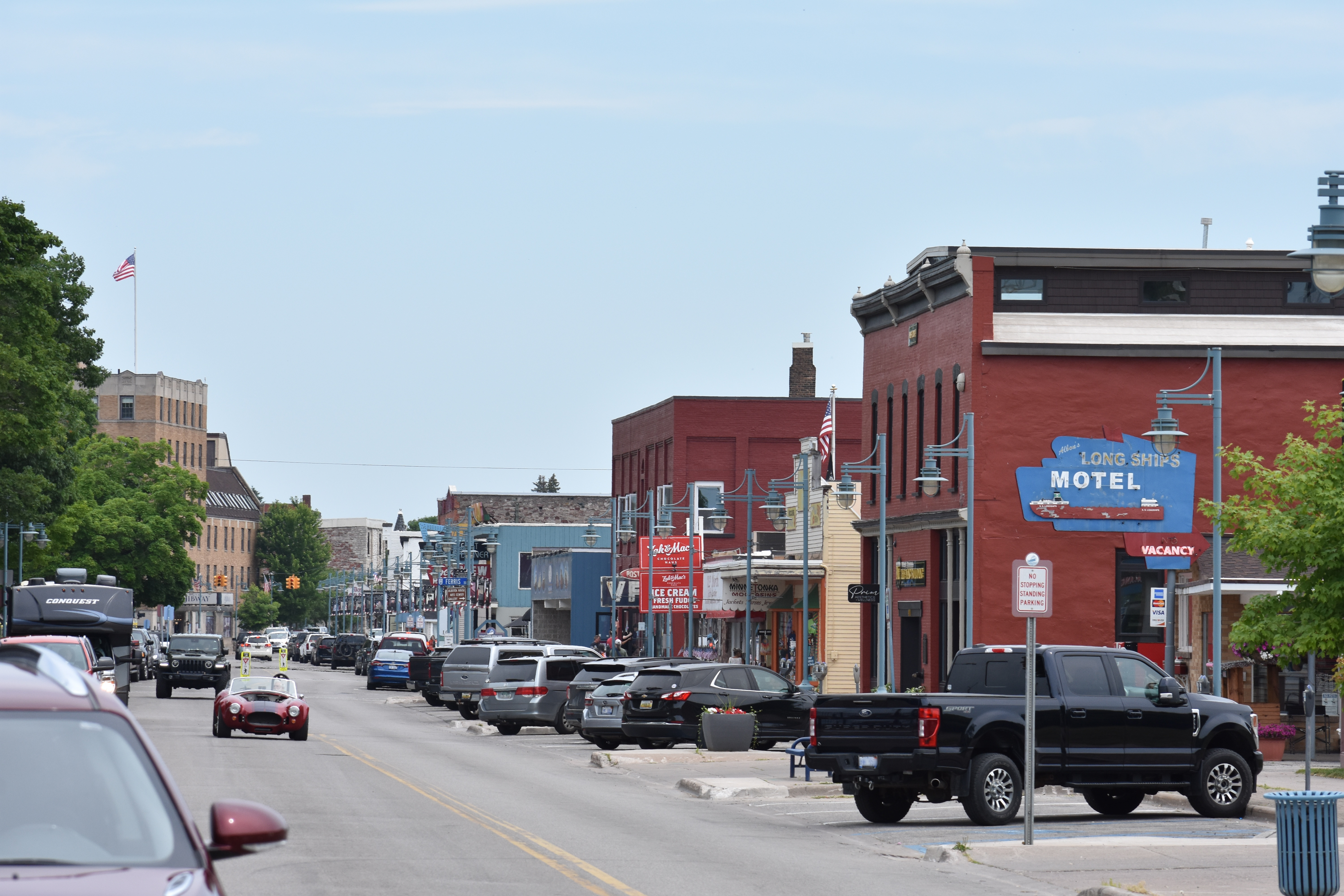
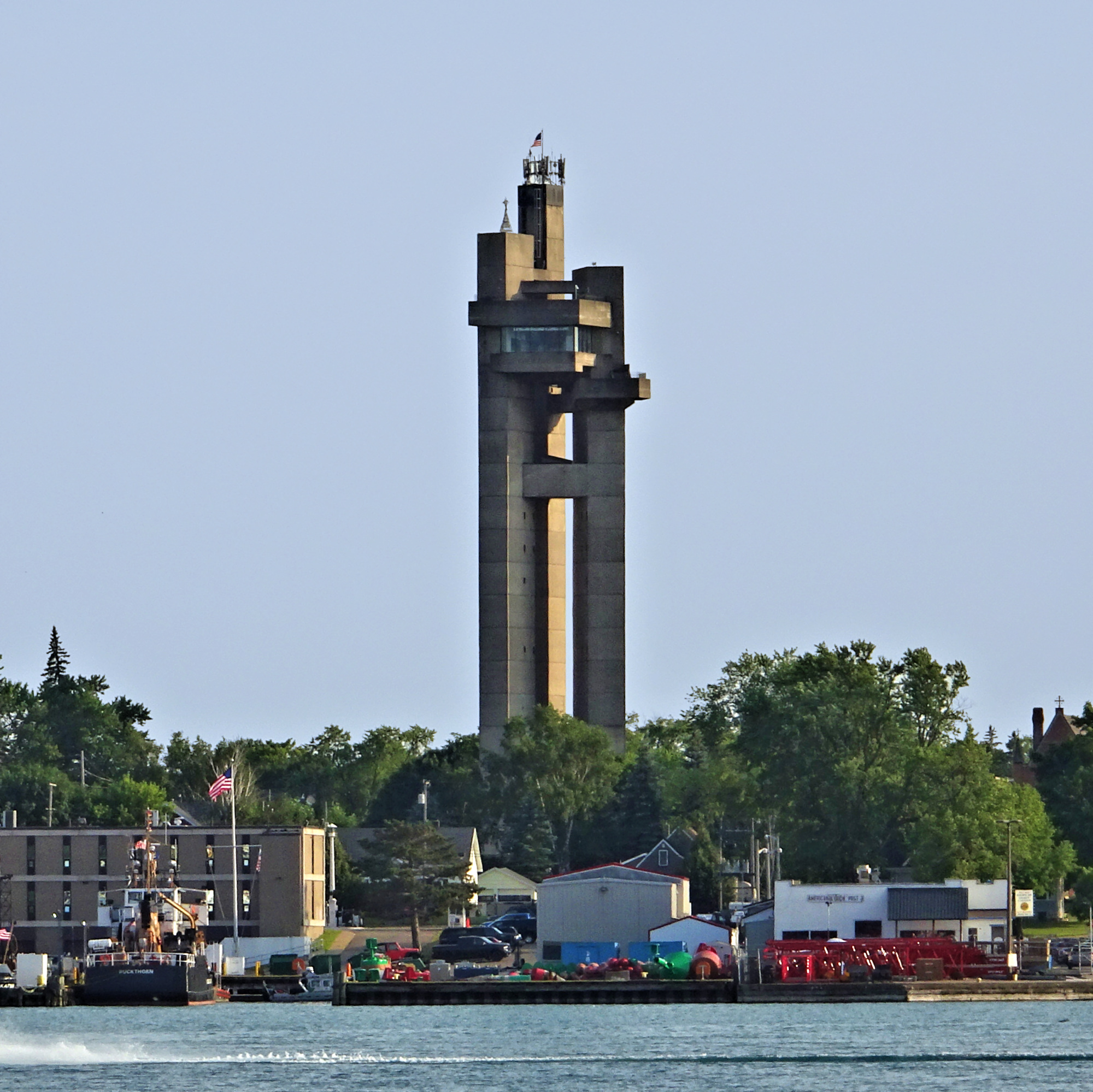
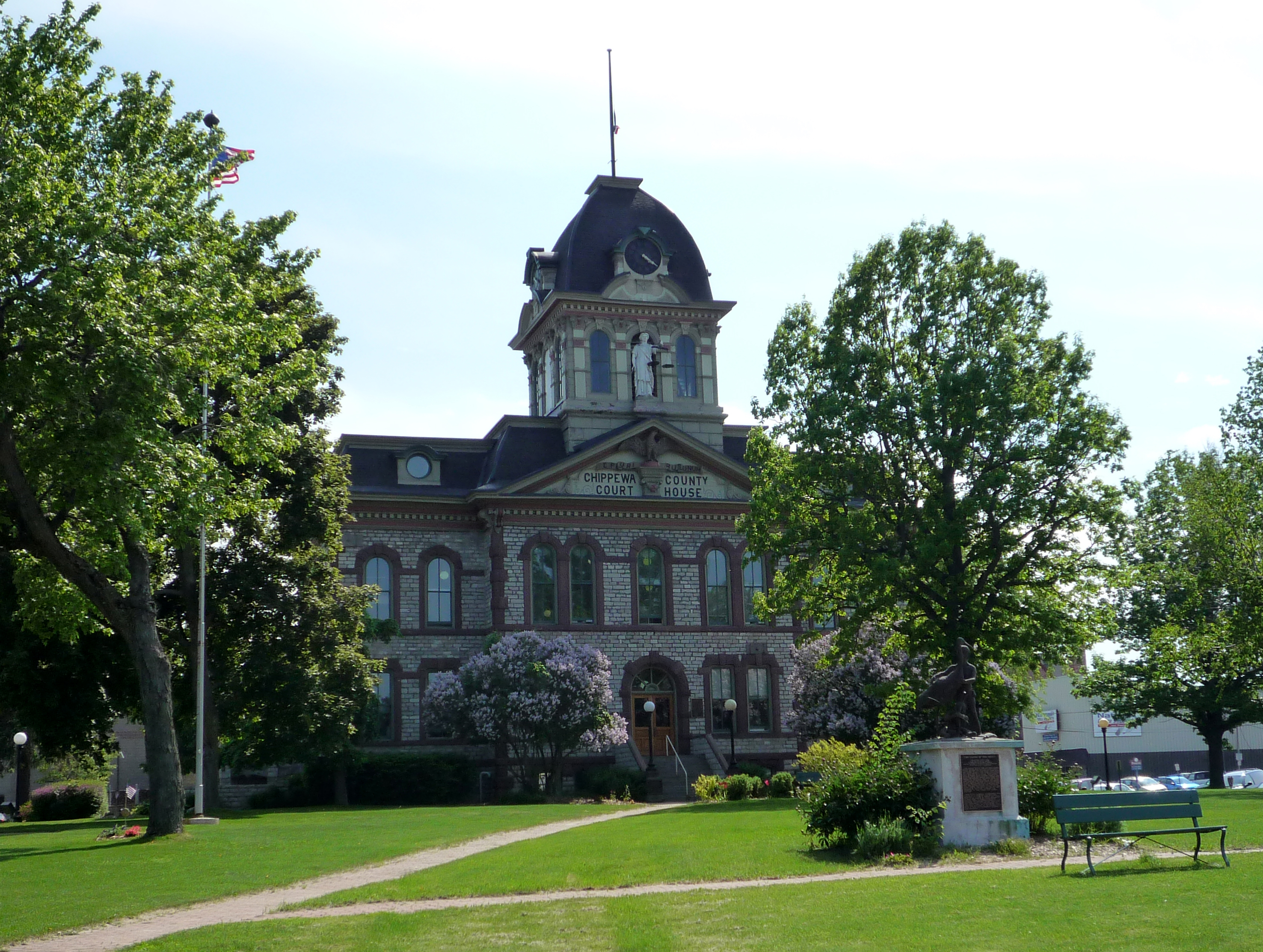
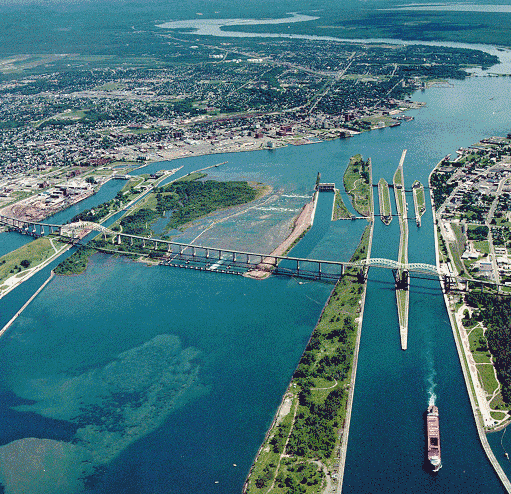
- View of Sault Ste. Marie from the Canadian side of the St. Marys River West Portage Street Tower of History Chippewa County Courthouse Soo Locks

- Flag Seal
- Nicknames: The Sault, The Soo
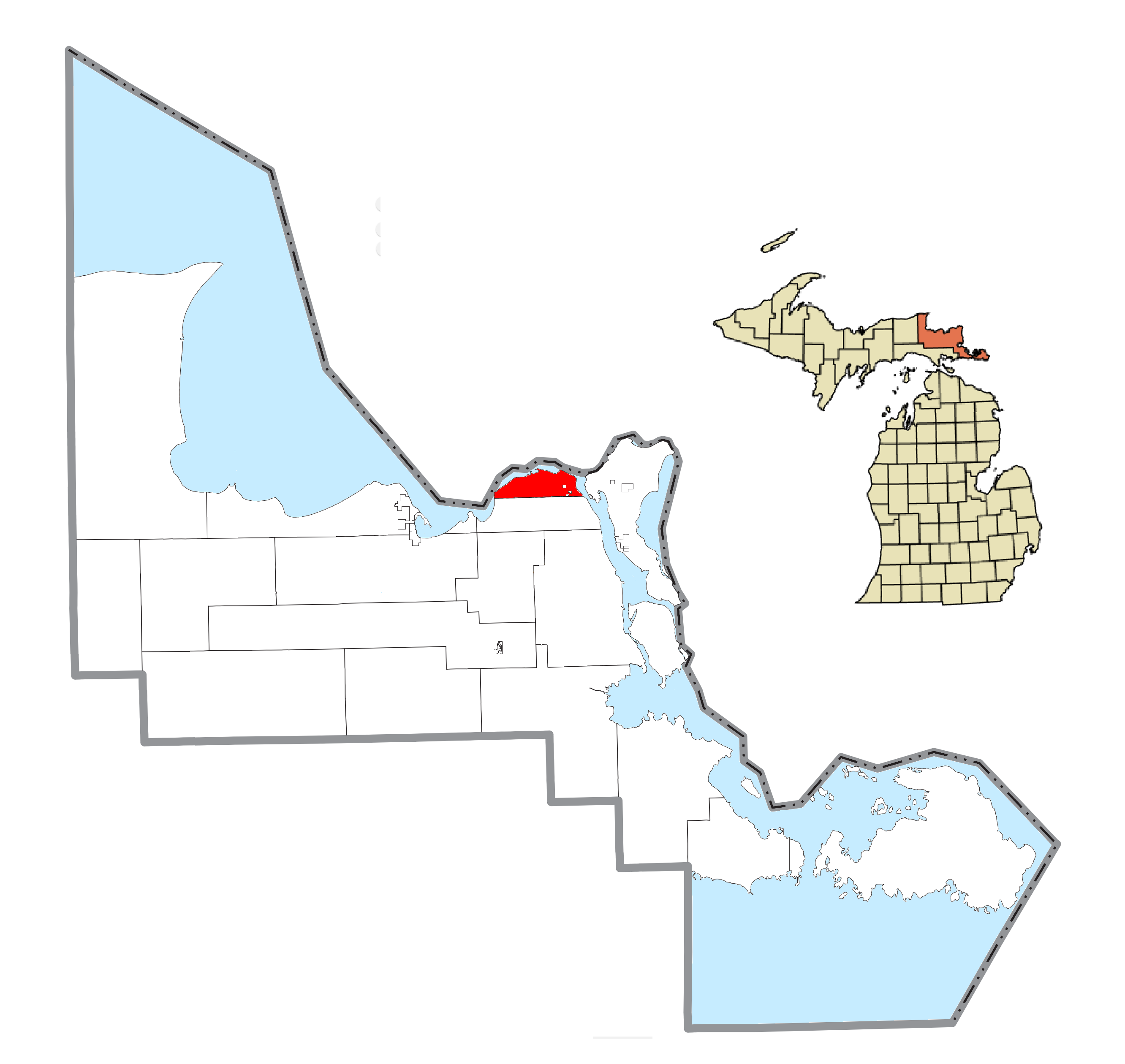
- Location within Chippewa County

- Location within the state of Michigan Location within the United States
- Coordinates: 46°29′49″N 84°20′44″W
- Country: United States
- State: Michigan
- County: Chippewa
- Established: 1668
- Incorporated: 1879 (village); 1887 (city)

Government
  - Type: Council–manager
  - Mayor: Don Gerrie
  - Manager: Brian Chapman

Area
  - Total: 20.02 sq mi (51.86 km^{2})
  - Land: 14.76 sq mi (38.22 km^{2})
  - Water: 5.27 sq mi (13.64 km^{2}) 26.74%
- Elevation: 617 ft (188 m)

Population (2020)
  - Total: 13,337
  - Density: 903.8/sq mi (348.95/km^{2})
- Time zone: UTC-5 (EST)
  - Summer (DST): UTC-4 (EDT)
- ZIP code(s): 49783
- Area code: 906
- FIPS code: 26-71740
- GNIS feature ID: 637276
- Website: www.saultcity.com

Sault Ste. Marie (/ˌsuː seɪnt məˈriː/ SOO saynt mə-REE; Ojibwe: Baawitigong) is a city in the Upper Peninsula of the U.S. state of Michigan. It is the county seat of Chippewa County and is the only city within the county. With a recorded population of 13,337 from the 2020 census, it is the second-most populated city in the Upper Peninsula, behind Marquette. It is the primary city of the Sault Ste. Marie, MI Micropolitan Statistical Area, which encompasses all of Chippewa County and had a population of 36,785 at the 2020 census. Sault Ste. Marie was settled by mostly French colonists in 1668, making it the oldest city in Michigan.

Sault Ste. Marie is located along the St. Marys River, which flows from Lake Superior to Lake Huron and forms part of the United States–Canada border. Across the river is the larger city of Sault Ste. Marie, Ontario; the two cities are connected by the Sault Ste. Marie International Bridge. Between the two cities are the Soo Locks, a set of locks allowing ship travel between Lake Superior and the Lower Great Lakes.

Sault Ste. Marie is home to Lake Superior State University.

== Etymology ==
The city name was derived from the French term for the nearby rapids, which were called Les Saults de Sainte Marie. Sainte Marie (Saint Mary) was the name of the river and Saults referred to the rapids. (The archaic spelling Sault is a relic of the Middle French Period. Latin salta successively became Old French salte (c. 800 – c. 1340), Middle French sault, and Modern French saut, as in the verb sauter, to jump.)

Whereas the modern saut means simply "(a) jump", sault in the 17th century was also applied to cataracts, waterfalls and rapids. This resulted in such place names as Grand Falls/Grand-Sault, and Sault-au-Récollet on the Island of Montreal in Canada; and Sault-Saint-Remy and Sault-Brénaz in France. In contemporary French, the word for "rapids" is rapides.

Sault Sainte-Marie in French means "the Rapids of Saint Mary" (for a more detailed discussion, refer to the Sault Ste. Marie, Ontario page). The Saint Mary's River runs from Lake Superior to Lake Huron, between what are now the twin border cities on either side.

No hyphens are used in the English spelling, which is otherwise identical to the French, but the pronunciations differ. Anglophones say /ˌsuː seɪnt məˈriː/ and Francophones say [so sɛ̃t maʁi]. In French, the name can be written Sault-Sainte-Marie. On both sides of the border, the towns and the general vicinity are called The Sault (usually pronounced /suː/), or The Soo.

== History ==
Historical Affiliations

Anishinaabe 1668–1671
Kingdom of France 1671–1763
British Empire 1763–1783
United States 1783–present

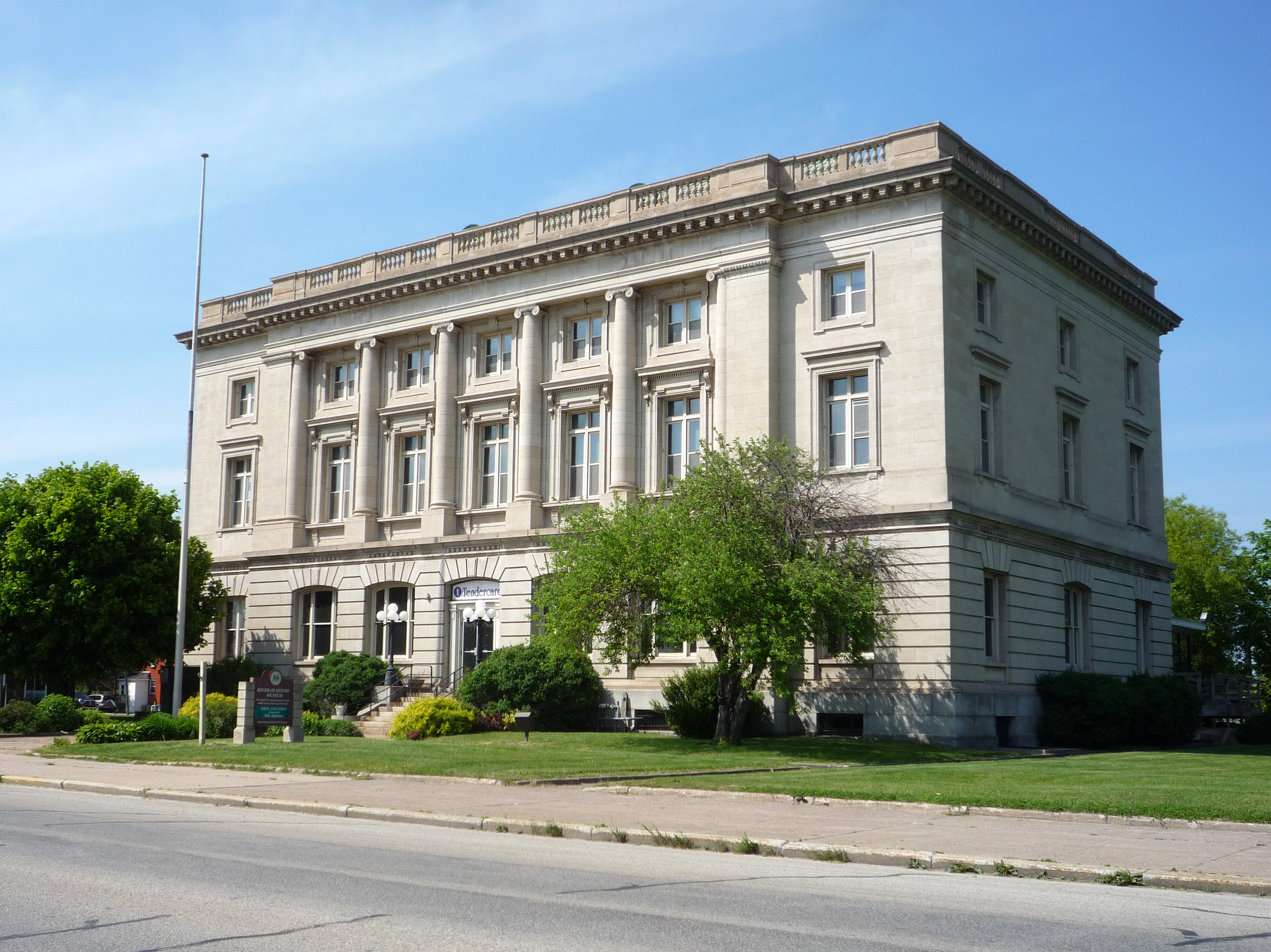
After being replaced, the Old Federal Building was used by the city for the River of History Museum. It has been renovated for use as the City Hall. The building is on the National Register of Historic Places.

For centuries, Oc̣eṭi Ṡakowiƞ (Dakota, Lakota, Nakoda), or Sioux, people lived in the area.

In 1668, French missionaries Claude Dablon and Jacques Marquette founded a Jesuit mission at this site. Sault Ste. Marie developed as one of oldest European cities in the United States west of the Appalachian Mountains, and the oldest permanent European settlement in Michigan. On June 4, 1671, Simon-François Daumont de Saint-Lusson, a colonial agent, was dispatched from Quebec to the distant tribes, proposing a congress of Indian nations at the Falls of St. Mary between Lake Huron and Lake Superior. Trader Nicolas Perrot helped attract the principal chiefs, and representatives of 14 Indigenous nations were invited for the elaborate ceremony. The French officials proclaimed France's appropriation of the immense territory surrounding Lake Superior in the name of King Louis XIV.

In the 18th century, the settlement became an important center of the fur trade, when it was a post for the British-owned North West Company, based in Montreal. The fur trader John Johnston, a Scots-Irish immigrant from Belfast, was considered the first European settler in 1790. He married a high-ranking Ojibwe woman named Ozhaguscodaywayquay, the daughter of a prominent chief, Waubojeeg. She also became known as Susan Johnston. Their marriage was one of many alliances in the northern areas between high-ranking European traders and Ojibwe. The family was prominent among Native Americans, First Nations, and Europeans from both Canada and the United States. They had eight children who learned fluent Ojibwe, English and French. The Johnstons entertained a variety of trappers, explorers, traders, and government officials, especially during the years before the War of 1812 between Britain and the United States.

For more than 140 years, the settlement was a single community under French colonial, and later, British colonial rule. After the War of 1812, a US–UK Joint Boundary Commission finally fixed the border in 1817 between the Michigan Territory of the US and the British Province of Upper Canada to follow the river in this area. Whereas traders had formerly moved freely through the whole area, the United States forbade Canadian traders from operating in the United States, which reduced their trade and disrupted the area's economy. The American and Canadian communities of Sault Ste. Marie were each incorporated as independent municipalities toward the end of the 19th century.

As a result of the fur trade, the settlement attracted Ojibwe and Ottawa, Métis, and ethnic Europeans of various nationalities. It was a two-tiered society, with fur traders (who had capital) and their families and upper-class Ojibwe in the upper echelon. In the aftermath of the War of 1812, however, the community's society changed markedly.

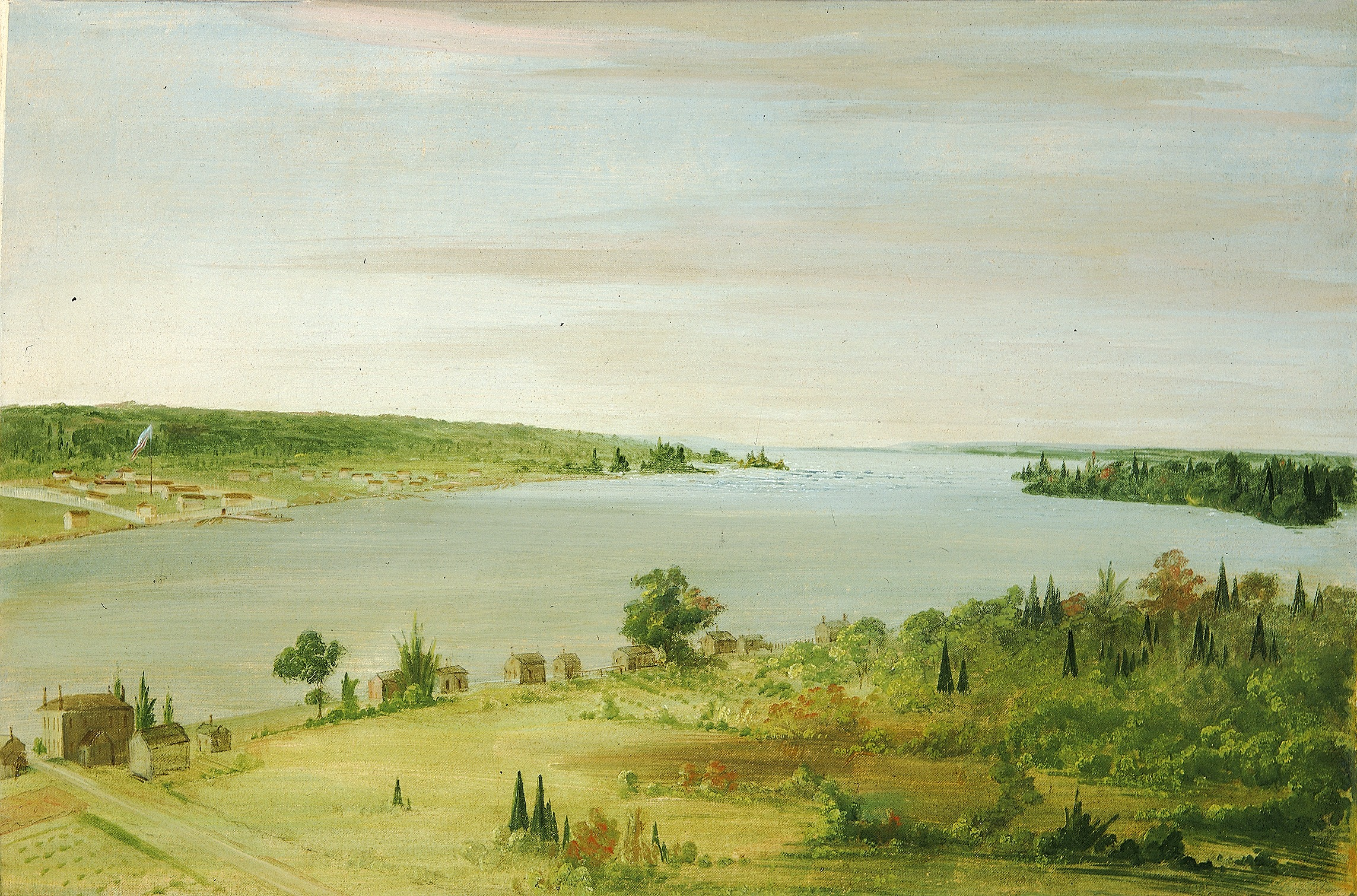
Sault Ste. Marie, Showing the United States Garrison in the Distance (George Catlin, c. 1837)

The U.S. built Fort Brady near the settlement, introducing new troops and settlers, mostly Anglo-American. The UK and the US settled on a new northern boundary in 1817, dividing the US and Canada along St. Mary's River. The US prohibited British fur traders from operating in the United States. After completion of the Erie Canal in New York State in 1825 (expanded in 1832), the number of settlers migrating to Ohio and Michigan increased dramatically from New York and New England, bringing with them the Yankee culture of the Northern Tier. Their numbers overwhelmed the cosmopolitan culture of the earlier settlers. They practiced more discrimination against Native Americans and Métis.

The falls proved a choke point for shipping between the Great Lakes. Early ships traveling to and from Lake Superior were portaged around the rapids in a lengthy process (much like moving a house) that could take weeks. Later, only the cargoes were unloaded, hauled around the rapids, and then loaded onto other ships waiting below the rapids. The first American lock, the State Lock, was built in 1855; it was instrumental in improving shipping. The lock has been expanded and improved over the years.

In 1900, Northwestern Leather Company opened a tannery in Sault Ste. Marie. The tannery was founded to process leather for the upper parts of shoes, which was finer than that for soles. After the factory closed in 1958, the property was sold to Filborn Limestone, a subsidiary of Algoma Steel Corporation.

In March 1938 during the Great Depression, Sophia Nolte Pullar bequeathed $70,000 for construction of the Pullar Community Building, which opened in 1939. This building held an indoor ice rink composed of artificial ice, then a revolutionary concept. The ice rink is still owned by the city.

== Geography ==
According to the United States Census Bureau, the city has an area of 20.16 square miles (52.21 km^{2}), of which 14.77 square miles (38.25 km^{2}) is land and 5.39 square miles (13.96 km^{2}) is water. The city's downtown is on an island, formed by the Sault Ste. Marie Power Canal to the south and the St. Mary's River and Soo Locks to the north.

=== Climate ===
Under the Köppen climate classification, Sault Ste. Marie has a humid continental climate (Dfb) with cold, snowy winters and warm summers. Sault Ste. Marie is one of the snowiest places in Michigan, receiving an average of 120 inches (3.0 m) of snow per winter season, with a record year when 209 inches (5.3 m) fell. 62 inches (1.6 m) of snow fell in one five-day snowstorm, including 28 inches (71 cm) in 24 hours, in December 1995. During this time, the city proper experienced a far greater level of snowfall than the farmlands past the canal and riverfront due to lake-effect snow. This caused the 1437th MRBC National Guard local armory to be mobilized for disaster relief in order to remove hundreds of tons of snow which effectively blockaded people within their own homes. Precipitation measured as equivalent rainfall, Sault Ste. Marie receives an annual average of 34.46 inches (875 mm). The cloudier portion of the year in Sault Ste. Marie lasts some seven months, beginning in October and ending in May.

Temperatures in Sault Ste. Marie have varied between a record low of −36 °F (−38 °C) and a record high of 98 °F (37 °C). Monthly average temperatures range from 13 °F (−11 °C) in January to 64 °F (18 °C) in July. On average, only two out of every five years reaches 90 °F (32 °C), while there are 85.5 days annually where the high remains at or below freezing and 26.5 nights with a low of 0 °F (−18 °C) or colder.

Average monthly precipitation is lowest in February, and highest in September and October. This autumn maximum in precipitation, unusual for humid continental climates, owes to this area's Great Lakes location. From May through July (usually the year's wettest months in most of the upper Midwestern United States, away from large bodies of water), the lake waters surrounding Sault Ste. Marie are cooler than nearby land areas. This tends to stabilize the atmosphere, suppressing precipitation (especially showers and thunderstorms) somewhat, in May, June and July. In autumn, the lakes are releasing their stored heat from the summer, making them warmer than the surrounding land, and increasingly frequent and strong polar and Arctic air outbreaks pick up warmth and moisture during their over-water passage, resulting in clouds and instability showers. In Sault Ste. Marie, this phenomenon peaks in September and October, making these the wettest months of the year. Also noteworthy is that in Sault Ste. Marie, the year's third wettest month, on average, is November, and not any summer month.

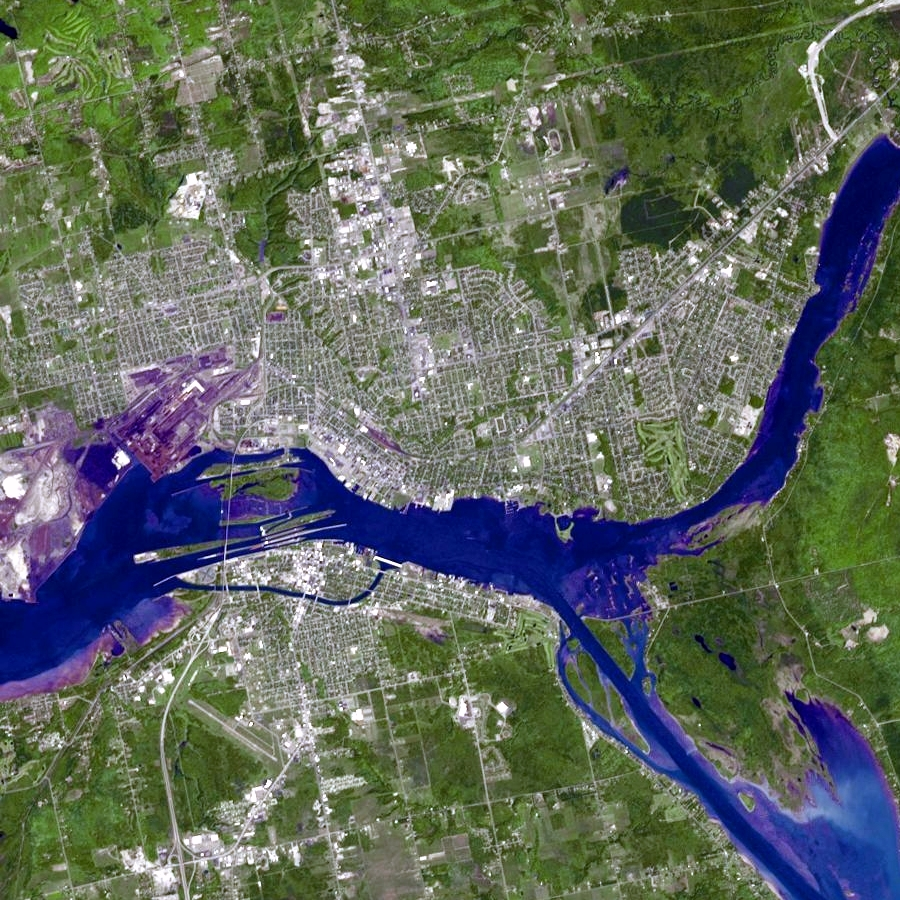
Satellite image from June 2007

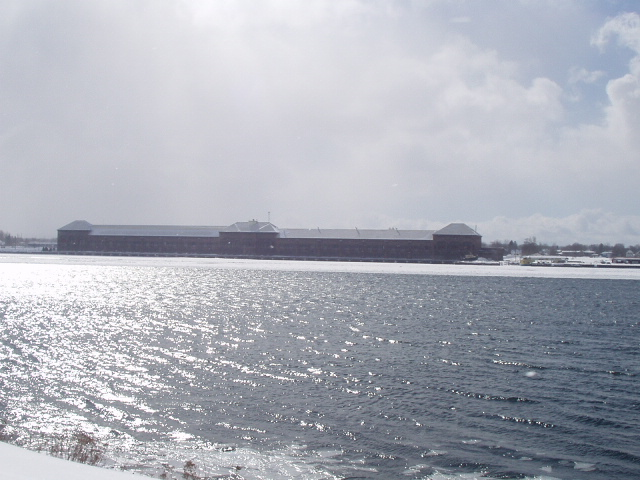
Sault Ste. Marie, Michigan Saint Marys Falls Hydropower Plant generation station

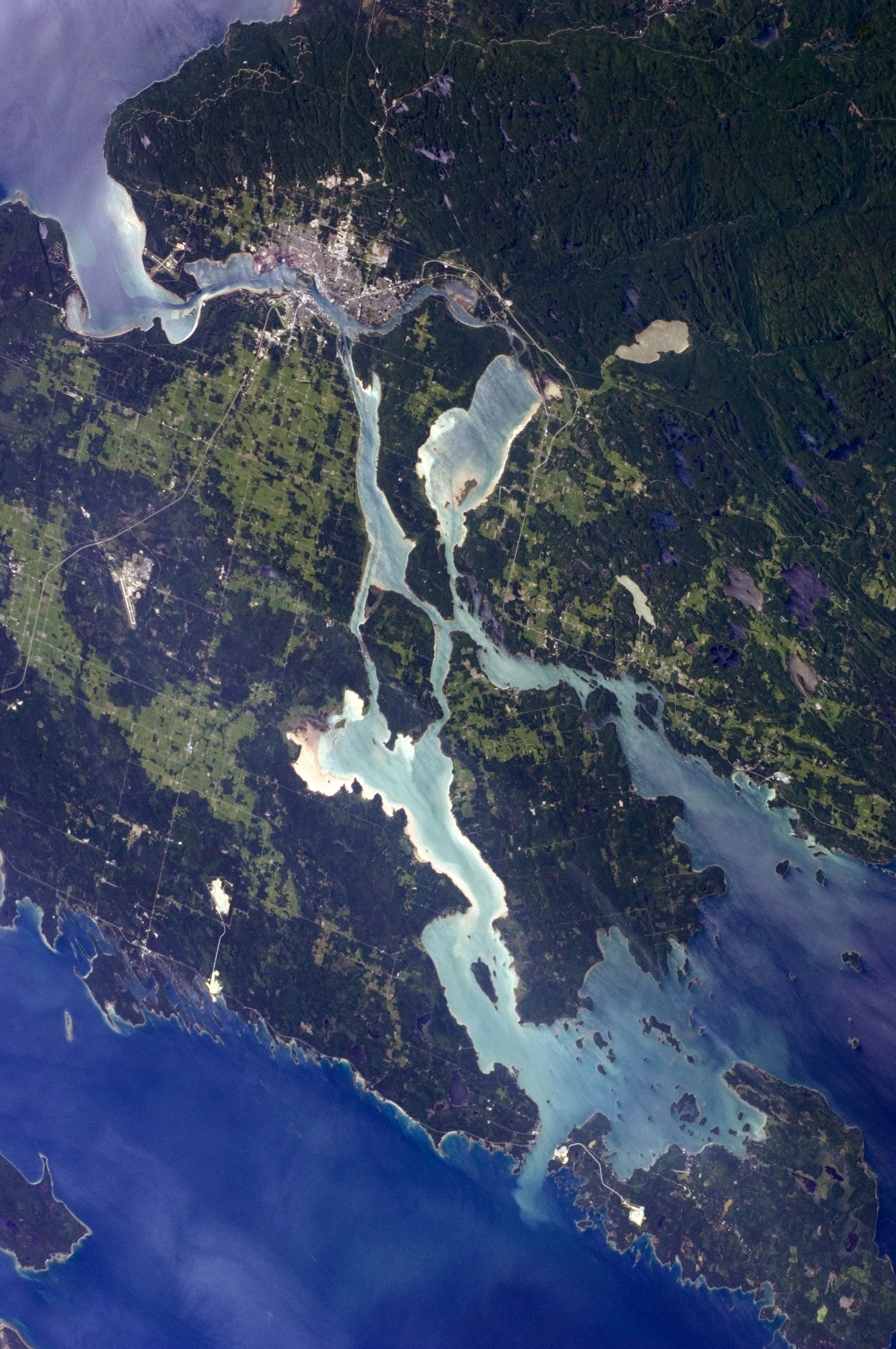
Astronaut photograph of Sault Ste. Marie

Climate data for Sault Ste. Marie, Michigan (Sault Ste. Marie Municipal Airport) 1991–2020 normals, (Note: Mean monthly maxima and minima (i.e. the highest and lowest temperature readings during an entire month or year) calculated based on data at said location from 1991 to 2020.) extremes 1888–present
Month	Jan	Feb	Mar	Apr	May	Jun	Jul	Aug	Sep	Oct	Nov	Dec	Year
Record high °F (°C)	48 (9)	50 (10)	83 (28)	85 (29)	91 (33)	93 (34)	98 (37)	98 (37)	95 (35)	83 (28)	74 (23)	62 (17)	98 (37)
Mean maximum °F (°C)	39.3 (4.1)	41.9 (5.5)	52.5 (11.4)	67.5 (19.7)	81.8 (27.7)	85.6 (29.8)	87.7 (30.9)	86.6 (30.3)	81.6 (27.6)	71.8 (22.1)	56.4 (13.6)	44.5 (6.9)	89.4 (31.9)
Mean daily maximum °F (°C)	24.0 (−4.4)	26.4 (−3.1)	35.5 (1.9)	48.5 (9.2)	63.2 (17.3)	72.5 (22.5)	76.8 (24.9)	75.8 (24.3)	68.0 (20.0)	54.1 (12.3)	41.2 (5.1)	30.5 (−0.8)	51.4 (10.8)
Daily mean °F (°C)	16.2 (−8.8)	17.8 (−7.9)	26.7 (−2.9)	39.4 (4.1)	52.1 (11.2)	61.1 (16.2)	66.0 (18.9)	65.6 (18.7)	58.4 (14.7)	46.3 (7.9)	34.8 (1.6)	23.8 (−4.6)	42.4 (5.8)
Mean daily minimum °F (°C)	8.4 (−13.1)	9.3 (−12.6)	17.9 (−7.8)	30.2 (−1.0)	41.0 (5.0)	49.7 (9.8)	55.2 (12.9)	55.4 (13.0)	48.7 (9.3)	38.5 (3.6)	28.3 (−2.1)	17.1 (−8.3)	33.3 (0.7)
Mean minimum °F (°C)	−14.0 (−25.6)	−11.1 (−23.9)	−4.4 (−20.2)	15.9 (−8.9)	29.8 (−1.2)	37.4 (3.0)	45.0 (7.2)	45.0 (7.2)	35.5 (1.9)	26.7 (−2.9)	10.4 (−12.0)	−5.1 (−20.6)	−17.6 (−27.6)
Record low °F (°C)	−36 (−38)	−37 (−38)	−28 (−33)	−13 (−25)	18 (−8)	26 (−3)	36 (2)	29 (−2)	25 (−4)	15 (−9)	−12 (−24)	−31 (−35)	−37 (−38)
Average precipitation inches (mm)	2.21 (56)	1.51 (38)	1.81 (46)	2.63 (67)	2.64 (67)	2.85 (72)	3.07 (78)	3.19 (81)	3.93 (100)	4.38 (111)	3.44 (87)	2.80 (71)	34.46 (875)
Average snowfall inches (cm)	30.3 (77)	20.7 (53)	13.0 (33)	7.6 (19)	0.4 (1.0)	0.0 (0.0)	0.0 (0.0)	0.0 (0.0)	0.0 (0.0)	1.7 (4.3)	16.0 (41)	30.4 (77)	120.1 (305)
Average precipitation days (≥ 0.01 in)	18.5	13.5	12.3	11.7	11.2	11.1	11.3	10.6	13.1	16.5	16.5	18.6	164.9
Average snowy days (≥ 0.1 in)	19.6	15.5	10.4	5.5	0.5	0.0	0.0	0.0	0.1	2.0	10.3	17.4	81.3
Average relative humidity (%)	77.2	75.2	74.7	69.9	67.9	74.7	76.3	79.6	81.6	80.4	81.7	81.0	76.7
Average dew point °F (°C)	7.5 (−13.6)	8.2 (−13.2)	17.2 (−8.2)	28.2 (−2.1)	38.7 (3.7)	49.3 (9.6)	55.6 (13.1)	55.6 (13.1)	48.6 (9.2)	38.3 (3.5)	27.3 (−2.6)	14.7 (−9.6)	32.4 (0.2)
Mean monthly sunshine hours	104.9	142.5	206.4	227.5	280.3	281.2	303.6	248.9	172.9	122.6	70.4	77.4	2,238.6
Percentage possible sunshine	37	49	56	56	60	59	64	57	46	36	25	29	50
Source: NOAA (relative humidity, dew point, and sun 1961–1990)

== Demographics ==
Historical population
Census	Pop.	Note	%±
1860	596		—
1880	1,947		—
1890	5,760		195.8%
1900	10,538		83.0%
1910	12,615		19.7%
1920	12,096		−4.1%
1930	13,755		13.7%
1940	15,847		15.2%
1950	17,912		13.0%
1960	18,722		4.5%
1970	15,136		−19.2%
1980	14,448		−4.5%
1990	14,689		1.7%
2000	14,324		−2.5%
2010	14,144		−1.3%
2020	13,337		−5.7%

=== 2020 census ===
As of the 2020 census, Sault Ste. Marie had a population of 13,337. The median age was 35.8 years. 20.1% of residents were under the age of 18 and 17.2% of residents were 65 years of age or older. For every 100 females there were 95.8 males, and for every 100 females age 18 and over there were 94.2 males age 18 and over.

92.3% of residents lived in urban areas, while 7.7% lived in rural areas.

There were 5,628 households in Sault Ste. Marie, of which 26.4% had children under the age of 18 living in them. Of all households, 33.6% were married-couple households, 24.3% were households with a male householder and no spouse or partner present, and 32.1% were households with a female householder and no spouse or partner present. About 36.6% of all households were made up of individuals and 13.9% had someone living alone who was 65 years of age or older.

The population density was 903.8 inhabitants per square mile (349.0/km^{2}). There were 6,234 housing units at an average density of 422.4 per square mile (163.1/km^{2}). Of all housing units, 9.7% were vacant. The homeowner vacancy rate was 2.6% and the rental vacancy rate was 6.4%.

Racial composition as of the 2020 census
Race	Number	Percent
White	9,183	68.9%
Black or African American	129	1.0%
American Indian and Alaska Native	2,375	17.8%
Asian	118	0.9%
Native Hawaiian and Other Pacific Islander	6	0.0%
Some other race	101	0.8%
Two or more races	1,425	10.7%
Hispanic or Latino (of any race)	325	2.4%

== Education ==
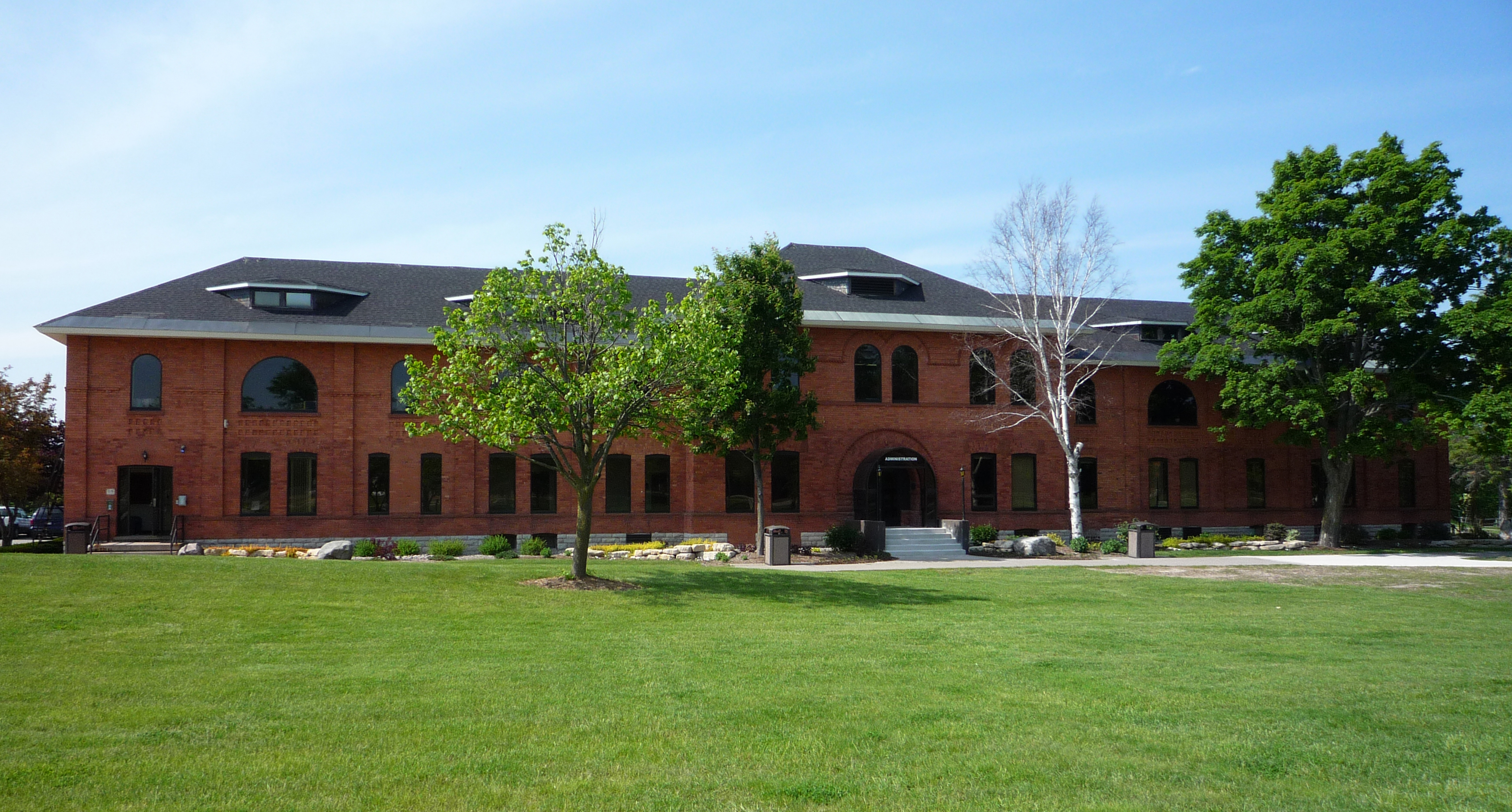
LSSU's campus was originally Fort Brady.

=== University ===
Sault Ste. Marie is home to Lake Superior State University (LSSU), founded in 1946 as an extension campus of Michigan College of Mining and Technology (now Michigan Technological University); the campus was originally Fort Brady. LSSU is home to the LSSU Lakers (D1 Hockey (CCHA), D2 all other sports (GLIAC)). LSSU has around 1500 students, making it Michigan's smallest public university.

=== Primary and secondary education ===
The area school district is Sault Ste. Marie Area Schools.

The Sault's primary public high school is Sault Area High School (SAHS). "Sault High" is one of the few high schools in the state with attached career center. The school's mascot is the Blue Devil. "Sault High" houses a variety of successful varsity sports teams, such as hockey, wrestling, baseball, and basketball. Altogether, the school provides 24 competitive sports teams for both boys and girls at all levels. The school district also operates Malcolm High School as an alternative high school.

Sault Ste. Marie has two middle schools, one in the Sault Ste. Marie School System known as Sault Area Middle School. Before the 6th grade annex was added in the late 1980s, the school was referred to as Sault Area Junior High School. The Second Middle School is a part of Joseph K. Lumsden Bahweting School, a Native American-affiliated Public School Academy.

There are two elementary schools in Sault Ste. Marie, Lincoln Elementary and Washington Elementary. There is also a Public School Academy, Joseph K. Lumsden Bahweting School, and the St. Mary's Catholic School. Jefferson Elementary, McKinley Elementary, Bruce Township Elementary, and Soo Township Elementary (converted into an Alternative High School) have closed because of declining enrollment in the school system.

St. Mary's Catholic School serves students in grades K–8. It is affiliated with the Roman Catholic Diocese of Marquette.

There is a Bureau of Indian Education-affiliated tribal school, Joseph K. Lumsden Bahweting Anishnabe School. It was established in 1994 and received its current name in 1998.

== Media ==
=== TV ===
All stations listed here are rebroadcasters of television stations based in Traverse City and Cadillac.

- Channel 8: WGTQ, ABC (rebroadcasts WGTU); NBC on digital subchannel 8.2 (rebroadcasts WPBN-TV), Charge! on digital subchannel 8.3
- Channel 10: WWUP, CBS (rebroadcasts WWTV); Fox on digital subchannel 10.2 (rebroadcasts WFQX-TV), MeTV on digital subchannel 10.3, Laff on digital subchannel 10.4, QVC on digital subchannel 10.5, and HSN on digital subchannel 10.6
- Channel 28: W28DY-D, 3ABN (all programming via satellite)

NBC and ABC are also served by WTOM channel 4 from Cheboygan, which repeats WPBN-TV and WGTU. The market can also receive select over the air channels from Sault Ste. Marie, Ontario, including Global Toronto on channel 12.1 at CIII-DT-12, and CTV Northern Ontario on analog channel 2 at CHBX. Channel 8.3 was previously the science fiction network Comet until being replaced by Charge!, which is also operated by the Sinclair Broadcast Group.

The area has no local PBS, The CW, or MyNetworkTV service over-the-air. The Spectrum cable system offers all three in their regional packages through Marquette's PBS member station WNMU-TV, Cadillac's CW affiliate WFQX-CW, and joint MyNetworkTV/Cozi TV affiliate WXII-LD out of Cedar. The next closest PBS station after WNMU is Cadillac satellite station WCMV.

None of these stations are seen on cable in Sault Ste. Marie, Ontario, as Shaw Cable chooses to largely air Detroit affiliates for over the air channels, while WUHF in Rochester, New York, WPIX in New York City, New York, and WSBK-TV in Boston, Massachusetts, provide the closest Fox, CW, and MNTV affiliates carried by Shaw in the market.

=== Radio ===
Frequency	Call sign	Branding	Format	Owner	Notes
AM 1230	WSOO	1230 WSOO	adult contemporary/news/sports	Sovereign Communications	
AM 1400	WKNW	News Talk 1400	talk/sports	Sovereign Communications	
FM 91.5	WJOH	Smile FM	Contemporary Christian	Superior Communications	"Smile FM" (rebroadcasts WLGH from Lansing)
FM 98.3	WCMZ	CMU Public Radio	NPR/jazz	Central Michigan University	(rebroadcasts WCMU-FM from Mount Pleasant)
FM 99.5	WYSS	99.5 Yes FM	contemporary hit radio	Sovereign Communications	
FM 101.3	WSUE	Rock 101	active rock	Sovereign Communications	
FM 102.3	WTHN	The Promise FM	religious	Northern Christian Radio, Inc.	(rebroadcasts WPHN from Gaylord)
FM 103.3	W277AG		religious	Gospel Opportunities, Inc.	(rebroadcasts WHWL-FM from Marquette): The 46th Parallel Radio (college radio) (internet station broadcast from Lake Superior State University; previously on WLSO 90.1 FM)

Other radio stations serving the Sault Ste. Marie, Michigan, market:

Frequency	Call sign	Branding	Format	Owner	Notes
FM 88.1	CBON-FM-18	Ici Radio-Canada Première	news/talk	Canadian Broadcasting Corporation	French; repeats CBON-FM, Sudbury
FM 89.5	CBSM-FM	CBC Radio One	news/talk	Canadian Broadcasting Corporation	Repeats CBCS-FM, Sudbury
FM 93.9	WNBY	Oldies 93	oldies	Sovereign Communications	Originates from Newberry, Michigan
FM 95.1	WUPN	The Bridge	classic hits	Timothy S. Ellis(TSE Broadcasting LLC)	Originates from Pickford, Michigan
FM 97.9	WIHC	Strong Tower Radio	Christian radio	West Central Michigan Media Ministries	Originates from Newberry, Michigan
FM 100.5	CHAS-FM	Kiss 100.5	hot adult contemporary	Rogers Media	
FM 104.3	CJQM-FM	104.3 The Fox	Mainstream rock	Rogers Media	
FM 105.5	WMKD	Country 105	country music	Sovereign Communications	Originates from Pickford, Michigan
FM 106.5	CJTK-FM-8	KFM	Christian	Harvest Ministries Sudbury	Repeats CJTK-FM, Sudbury

=== Print ===
The city's main daily paper is The Sault News, formerly the Sault Evening News.

== Athletics ==
Spectator sports in Sault Ste. Marie include Lake Superior State University Athletics and the Soo Eagles of the Northern Ontario Junior Hockey League (NOJHL). The Lakers participate in NCAA Division I Ice Hockey and Division II Women's and Men's Basketball, Women's Volleyball, Women's and Men's Track and Field, Women's and Men's Swimming and Diving, and Women's and Men's Cross Country.

Nicknamed the Lakers, LSSU's hockey program is celebrating its 59th season of intercollegiate competition. The team plays its home contests at Taffy Abel Arena (4,000 seats) on LSSU's campus and is one of the most decorated programs in NCAA hockey history. The squad claimed two NAIA titles in the early 1970s (1972, 1974), before a run of three NCAA Division I championships (1988, 1992, 1994) and one finalist appearance (1993) in the late 1980s and early 1990s. In total, the Lakers have made 11 NCAA Division I Men's Ice Hockey Tournament appearances. The Lakers compete in the Central Collegiate Hockey Association (CCHA).

The rest of the athletic teams play in the Great Lakes Intercollegiate Athletic Conference (GLIAC). The basketball programs at LSSU have seen their share of success. The Men's program won overall GLIAC regular season titles in 2014–15, 2013–14, 1995-1996 (Tournament Champion) and also claimed the north division crown in 2008–09. LSSU's women's program won GLIAC gold from 2001 to 2002 through 2004–05. They also captured GLIAC tournament titles in 2002–03 and 2003–04. Both Men's and Women's squads play their home games in the Bud Cooper Gymnasium within the Norris Center.

Sault Ste. Marie is the home of the International 500 Snowmobile Race (commonly called the I-500), which takes place annually and draws participants and spectators from all over the U.S. and Canada. The race, which was inspired by the Indianapolis 500, originated in 1969 and has been growing ever since.

== Transportation ==
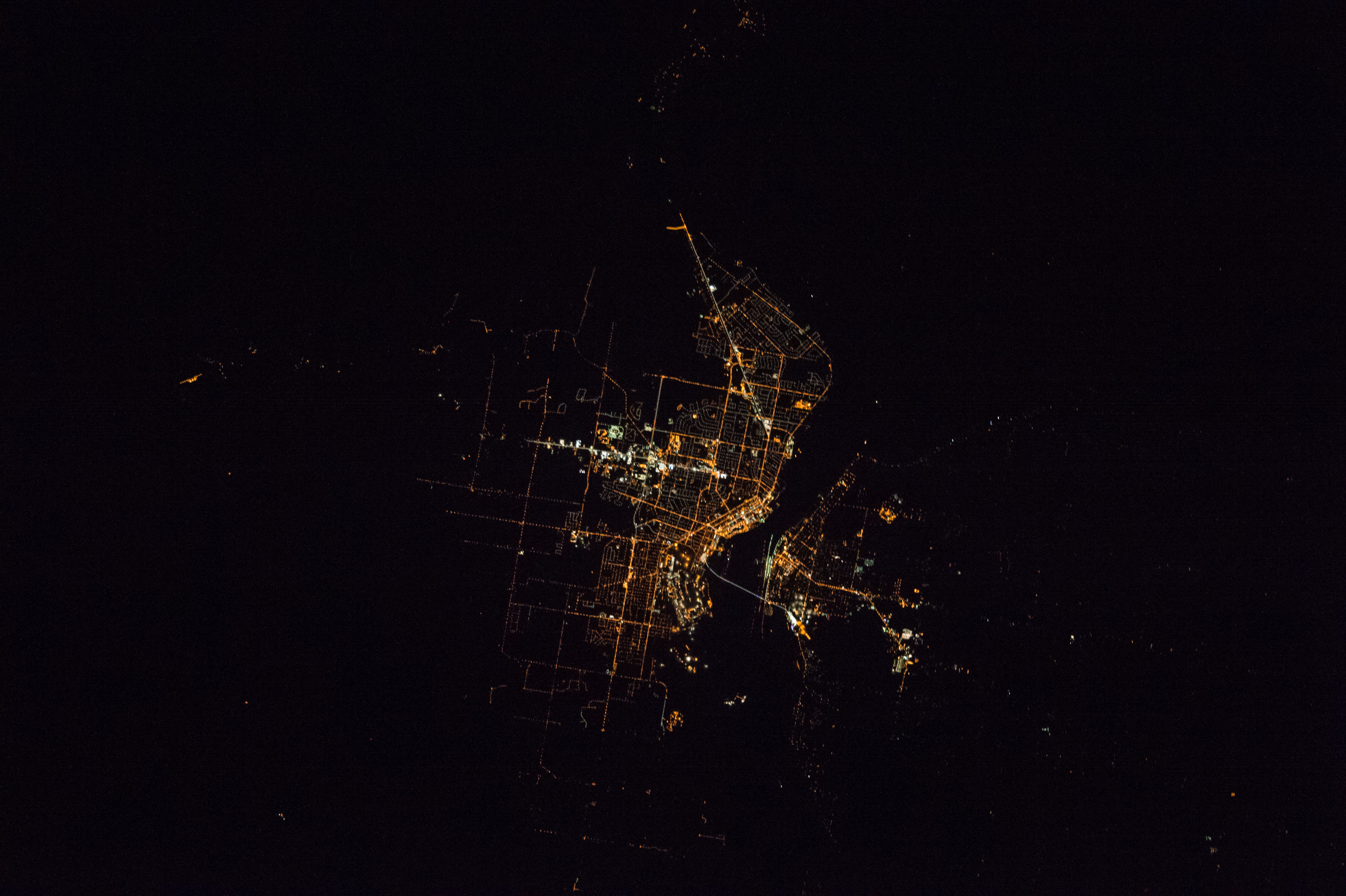
Sault Ste. Marie at night from the International Space Station in 2016. North is slightly above horizontal, to the left.

The city is home to the northern terminus of Interstate 75 (I-75), which connects with the Mackinac Bridge at St. Ignace approximately 50 miles (80 km) to the south, and continues south to near Miami. M-129 also has its northern terminus in the city. M-129 was at one time a part of the Dixie Highway system, which was intended to connect the northern industrial states with the southern agricultural states. Until 1984 the city was the eastern terminus of the western segment of US 2. County Highway H-63 (or Mackinac Trail) also has its northern terminus in the city and extends south to St. Ignace and follows a route very similar to I-75. The city is joined to its Canadian counterpart by the International Bridge, which connects I-75 in Sault Ste. Marie, Michigan, and Huron Street in Sault Ste. Marie, Ontario.

Commercial airline service is provided to the city by the Chippewa County International Airport in Kinross, about 20 miles (32 km) south of the city. Smaller general aviation aircraft also use the Sault Ste. Marie Municipal Airport about one 1 mile (1.6 km) southwest of downtown.

Sault Ste. Marie was the namesake of the Minneapolis, St. Paul and Sault Ste. Marie Railway, now the Soo Line Railroad, the U.S. arm of the Canadian Pacific Railway. This railroad had a bridge parallel to the International Bridge crossing the St. Marys River. The Soo Line has since, through a series of acquisitions and mergers of portions of the system, been split between Canadian Pacific and Canadian National Railway (CN). Canadian National operates the rail lines and the bridge in the Sault Ste. Marie area that were part of the Soo Line.

The Sugar Island Ferry provides automobile and passenger access between Sault Ste. Marie and Sugar Island, formerly a center of maple sugaring. The short route that the ferry travels crosses the shipping channel. Despite the high volume of freighter traffic through the locks, freighters typically do not dock in the Sault. However, the city hosts tugs, a tourist passenger ferry service, and a Coast Guard station along the shoreline on the lower (east) side of the Soo Locks. The United States Postal Service operates a "Marine Post Office", situated within the locks, to service ships as they pass through.

Shipping traffic in the Great Lakes system bypasses the rapids in the St. Marys River via the American Soo Locks. Locally, it is often claimed to be the world's busiest canal in terms of tonnage passing through it. The largest ships are 1,000 feet (300 m) long by 105 feet (32 m) wide. These are domestic carriers (called lakers). Smaller recreational and tour boats use the Canadian Sault Ste. Marie Canal. The lakers, being too large to transit the Welland Canal that bypasses Niagara Falls, are therefore land-locked. Foreign ships (termed salties) are smaller and can exit the Great Lakes to the St. Lawrence River and the Atlantic Ocean.

== Notable people ==
- Taffy Abel, former Olympic and NHL player
- Cliff Barton, former NHL player
- Bob Bemer, computer scientist
- Jeff Blashill, current head coach of the NHL's Chicago Blackhawks; former head coach of the NHL's Detroit Red Wings
- Rosalynn Bliss, Mayor of Grand Rapids
- Denton G. Burdick, Oregon state legislator
- Vic Desjardins, former NHL player
- John Johnston (1762–1828), married to Ozhaguscodaywayquay daughter of Waubojeeg, an Ojibwe chief
- Lloyd H. Kincaid, former Wisconsin State Senator
- Bruce Martyn, radio and TV play-by-play announcer of the Detroit Red Wings from 1964 to 1995
- Bun LaPrairie, former NHL player
- William McPherson, author and Washington Post writer
- Tip O'Neill, former NFL player
- Terry O'Quinn, best known for playing John Locke from the ABC show Lost
- Chase S. Osborn, Michigan's only Governor from the Upper Peninsula
- Abby Roque, PWHL ice hockey player and Olympian
- Jane Johnston Schoolcraft, the first Native American writer and poet; wife of Henry Rowe Schoolcraft
- Joseph H. Steere, Chief Justice of the Michigan Supreme Court
- Kim A. Wilcox, Chancellor of UC Riverside

== Notable landmarks ==
- The Tower of History is a 210-foot (64 m) observation tower, completed in 1968.
- Pullar Stadium was constructed starting in 1937 and opened in 1939. It is used as an ice arena where the Soo Eagles play.
- The Ramada Plaza Hotel Ojiway opened on December 31, 1927. The first owners were Beatrice and Leon Daglman. The building is 98 years old. The 27th Governor of Michigan Chase S. Osborn donated the site and $50,000. It was his dream to build a nice elegant hotel. Overall, it cost $250,000 to build it. On the day of its opening it had 91 rooms, 33 of which included bath tubs, 13 with showers, 34 with toilet and washbowls, and 11 just had a washbowl. This hotel was made for all the tourist who came to the town. Governor Chase S. Osborn and his family lived on the sixth floor for a while and so did Beatrice and Leon Daglman. The hotel contains 100 guestrooms, dining room, checkroom, barbershop and beauty parlor. Its decorated as an Art Deco architectural design, décor, detailed amenities and exceptional service gained national interest and attracted many famous guests including Jack Dempsey, Joe Louis and more recently President George H.W. Bush in 1992.
- The Soo Theatre at 534 Ashmun Street opened in March 1930 as a movie and live-performance house, built by Butterfield Michigan Theatres. It was converted to a two-screen cinema in 1974 and closed in 1998. In 2003 the nonprofit Soo Theatre Project, Inc. purchased the building, which it operates as a regional arts and education center while a phased restoration continues.
- Holy Name of Mary Pro-Cathedral (Sault Ste. Marie, Michigan) was begun by Jesuits in 1668. There are only two other parishes, one in St. Augustine, Florida and the other in Santa Fe, New Mexico, that are older in the United States.[3] On January 9, 1857 Pope Pius IX established the Diocese of Sault Ste. Marie[4] and St. Mary's was named the cathedral church for the new diocese. The present church, the fifth for the parish, was built in 1881. It was designed by Canadian architect Joseph Connolly in the Gothic Revival style. The church was extensively remodeled in three phases from the mid-1980s to the mid-1990s. In 1968 the parish built the Tower of History as a shrine to the Catholic missionaries who served the community.[5] It was designed to be a part of a larger complex that was to include a community center and a new church. Parish priorities changed and the structure was sold to Sault Historic Sites in 1980, who continues to operate it. Proceeds from the Tower of History still benefit the church.
- The Soo Locks are a set of parallel locks which enable ships to travel between Lake Superior and the lower Great Lakes. They are on the St. Marys River between Lake Superior and Lake Huron, between the Upper Peninsula of the U.S. state of Michigan and the Canadian province of Ontario. They bypass the rapids of the river, where the water falls 21 feet (7 m). The locks pass an average of 10,000 ships per year,[4] despite being closed during the winter from January through March, when ice shuts down shipping on the Great Lakes. The winter closure period is used to inspect and maintain the locks. The locks share a name (usually shortened and anglicized as Soo) with the two cities named Sault Ste. Marie, in Ontario and in Michigan, on either side of the St. Marys River. The Sault Ste. Marie International Bridge between the United States and Canada permits vehicular traffic to pass over the locks. A railroad bridge crosses the St. Marys River just upstream of the highway bridge.
- Taffy Abel Arena is the home of Lake Superior State University's Division 1 hockey team. The 4,000-seat arena is part of the Norris Center athletic complex on LSSU's campus. It was renovated in 1995 and is named after Clarence "Taffy" Abel. Abel was the first American born player to become an NHL regular and was born in the Soo.
- Lake Superior State University sits on the former site of U.S. Army's Fort Brady. The university has converted most of the buildings to serve housing and administrative needs for its students, faculty, guests and employees. The 115-acre campus includes several buildings which are listed in the National Register of Historic Places. The university has an enrollment of around 2500 students.
- The Saint Marys Falls Hydropower Plant (Edison Sault Power Plant), completed in 1902, is a hydroelectric station along the St. Marys River. Its sandstone powerhouse runs about 1,340 feet (410 m)—roughly a quarter mile—making it one of the longest horizontal-shaft hydroelectric powerhouses in the world and one of the oldest large generating stations still operating in the United States.

== Sister cities ==
- Sault Ste. Marie, Ontario, Canada (also twin city)
- Ryūō, Shiga, Japan

== See also ==
- Media in Sault Ste. Marie, Ontario
