= WUPN (FM) =

Radio station in Paradise–Sault Ste. Marie, Michigan

- Paradise, Michigan; United States
- Broadcast area: Sault Ste. Marie, Michigan
- Frequency: 95.1 MHz
- Branding: 94.5/95.1 The Bridge

Programming
- Language: English
- Format: Classic hits

Ownership
- Owner: Timothy S. Ellis; (TSE Broadcasting LLC)
- Sister stations: WMJT, WMJZ-FM

History
- First air date: 2012
- Call sign meaning: Upper PeNinsula

Technical information
- Licensing authority: FCC
- Facility ID: 170940
- Class: C3
- ERP: 25,000 watts
- HAAT: 71 meters (233 ft)
- Transmitter coordinates: 46°27′57.6″N 84°43′10.4″W

Links
- Public license information: Public file; LMS
- Webcast: Listen live
- Website: bridgefm.net

WUPN (95.1 MHz) is an American FM radio station licensed to serve the community of Paradise, an unincorporated community in Whitefish Township, Chippewa County, Michigan. The station is owned by Timothy S. Ellis, through licensee TSE Broadcasting LLC. WUPN broadcasts a classic hits format to the Sault Ste. Marie, Michigan, area.

== History ==
In May 2007, Darby Advertising, Inc., applied to the U.S. Federal Communications Commission (FCC) for a construction permit for a new broadcast radio station to broadcast on a frequency of 94.7 Megahertz. The FCC granted this permit on November 4, 2008, with a scheduled expiration date of November 4, 2011. The new station was assigned call sign WUPN on November 14, 2008.

In January 2011, with construction underway, WUPN applied to relocate its broadcast transmitter and change frequencies to 95.1 MHz. The FCC granted the station a modified permit on July 8, 2011, with the same scheduled expiration as the original permit, November 4, 2011. After construction and testing were completed in October 2011, the station was granted its broadcast license on January 23, 2012. The station began regular programming with its permanent Classic Hits format in October 2012.

WUPN has been promoted on their website as an independent and locally focused alternative to the high number of regional stations owned by Sovereign Communications, and while not a classic rock station, it has been promoted there as a spiritual successor to the former "Classic Rock: The Bear" on 97.9 WIHC in nearby Newberry. The station attracted early attention by hiring alumni of Sault Ste. Marie top 40 station WYSS as on-air personalities to effectively continue the former "Soo Morning Crew" morning drive programming that ended in 2010.

Paul VanWagoner, a long-time morning host and program director at WKNW, worked at WUPN from its inception until leaving the area in December 2015. Former WYSS staffer and DJ Tim Ellis replaced him at that time, with fellow WYSS alum John Gilbert following suit in February 2017 in on-air and operations management roles.

Effective December 1, 2018, Darby Advertising sold WUPN to Timothy Ellis' TSE Broadcasting LLC for $296,000.

On April 30, 2024, WUPN rebranded as "94.5/95.1 The Bridge", simulcast with WSBX 94.5 FM Mackinaw City.
