= WNBY (AM) =

Coordinates: 46°18′48″N 85°30′38″W

- Newberry, Michigan; United States
- Broadcast area: (Daytime) (Nighttime)
- Frequency: 1450 kHz
- Branding: WNBY 1450

Programming
- Format: Classic Country
- Affiliations: Michigan IMG Sports Network; Michigan Radio Network

Ownership
- Owner: Sovereign Communications
- Sister stations: WNBY-FM, WSOO, WSUE

History
- First air date: 1966
- Call sign meaning: Newberry

Technical information
- Licensing authority: FCC
- Facility ID: 20378
- Class: C
- Power: 1,000 watts

Links
- Public license information: Public file; LMS
- Website: 1450wnby.com

WNBY (1450 AM) is a radio station licensed to Newberry, Michigan broadcasting a classic country format. The station has been owned by Sovereign Communications since 2004, and shares a call-sign and ownership history with sister station WNBY-FM (Oldies 93), also based out of Newberry.

Launched by the Newberry Broadcasting Company in 1966 as the town's first radio station, WNBY was broadcasting an adult contemporary & country format when both WNBY & WNBY-FM were purchased by Prime Time Productions in 1979. Under their ownership, WNBY took on a middle of the road format in 1981, which WNBY-FM simulcasted until 1989. In 1982, Jack St. Andre purchased both stations, and they were inherited by his wife Peggy in 1993 after his death. She turned WNBY into an easy listening station. F&W Broadcasting bought the stations from Peggy St. Andre in 1995, and after a 1997–2002 stint as a news/talk station, WNBY adopted its current classic country format in 2002. Sovereign Communications purchased WNBY-AM-FM in 2004.

WNBY airs the popular local morning drive program Casey & The Coffee Crew and the call-in shopping program Trading Post on weekday mornings, as well as the seasonal hunting program Deer Hunters Round-Up, and live high school sports games featuring the Newberry Indians. On-air personalities include morning host and Newberry Indians play-by-play announcer Casey Cook, Trading Post host & DJ Travis Freeman, co-hosts Sarah Freeman & Jerry Carnes, Indians color commentator Josh Freed, and Sovereign Communications' chief meteorologist Karl Bohnak.

In February 2026, the Federal Communications Commission threatened to revoke WNBY and its sister station's licenses due to unpaid annual fees. According to the commission, Sovereign owes $37,250.51 in unpaid fees and has 60 days to respond.
