= WMKD =

Coordinates: 46.397°N 84.398°W

- Pickford, Michigan; United States
- Broadcast area: Sault Ste. Marie, Michigan
- Frequency: 105.5 MHz
- Branding: Country 105

Programming
- Format: Country
- Affiliations: Westwood One

Ownership
- Owner: Sovereign Communications

History
- First air date: January 2001
- Former call signs: WADW (1993-2005)
- Call sign meaning: Variation of former sister station WMKC

Technical information
- Licensing authority: FCC
- Facility ID: 59529
- Class: C1
- ERP: 100,000 watts
- HAAT: 77 meters

Links
- Public license information: Public file; LMS
- Webcast: Listen Live
- Website: country105fm.net

WMKD (105.5 FM) is a radio station licensed to Pickford, Michigan and the Sault Ste. Marie, Michigan & Ontario markets. Owned by Sovereign Communications, the station airs a country format. WMKD's studios and transmitter are located in Sault Ste. Marie, Michigan.

== History ==
Although a construction permit for 105.5 was granted in 1993, the station did not sign on until 2001. WADW originally broadcast an oldies format as "Memories 105.5". The station was soon sold to Starboard Media and was taken silent while Starboard prepared to broadcast its Relevant Radio on 105.5. WADW broadcast intermittently through the next three years, alternating between periods of silence and automated new age/smooth jazz music. In Summer 2005, Starboard sold the station to current owners Northern Star Broadcasting, who changed the call-sign to WMKD in November of that year, and briefly turned it into a simulcast of Traverse City modern rock station WJZJ. The station debuted its current country music format a few months later, maintaining a similar playlist & branding as WMKC in St. Ignace/Indian River. Northern Star Broadcasting sold the station to Sovereign Communications in 2010.

Local personalities include Jeff McNeice in morning drive, Country with Carsen middays, Lydia McNeice in afternoon drive, and the nationally syndicated The Lia Show overnights.

In February 2026, the Federal Communications Commission threatened to revoke WMKD and its sister station's licenses due to unpaid annual fees. According to the commission, Sovereign owes $37,250.51 in unpaid fees and has 60 days to respond.

== Sources ==
- Michiguide.com - WMKD History
