= WGMV =

- Stephenson, Michigan; United States
- Broadcast area: Escanaba/Gladstone and South Central Upper Michigan
- Frequency: 106.3 MHz
- Branding: Maverick 106

Programming
- Format: Classic country

Ownership
- Owner: Armada Media Corporation; (AMC Partners Escanaba, LLC)
- Sister stations: WCHT, WCMM, WGKL, WGLQ, WUPF

History
- First air date: March 2000
- Former call signs: WFON (1993–1998); WZRK (1998–1999); WWHK (1999); WMXG (1999–2018)
- Call sign meaning: Maverick

Technical information
- Licensing authority: FCC
- Facility ID: 51159
- Class: C2
- ERP: 50,000 watts
- HAAT: 151 meters (495 ft)
- Transmitter coordinates: 45°38′36″N 87°22′37″W

Links
- Public license information: Public file; LMS
- Website: radioresultsnetwork.com/maverick106/

WGMV (106.3 FM) is a radio station licensed to Stephenson, Michigan, United States, and serving south central Upper Michigan, including the cities of Escanaba, Gladstone, Iron Mountain, and Menominee. The station currently broadcasts a classic country format, and is owned by Armada Media Corporation, through licensee AMC Partners Escanaba, LLC.

== Station history ==
From 1984 to 1987, the 106.3 FM frequency was home to WCJL-FM, a contemporary hit radio-formatted station serving the Marinette, Wisconsin and Menominee, Michigan areas. The 106.3 frequency went dark when WCJL moved to the 103.9 frequency in 1987; the station today is classic hits-formatted WHYB (103.7 FM).

The station that would become WMXG was formally granted a license in October 1999 and commenced broadcasting in March 2000, with studios in Escanaba, Michigan. The station was originally owned by Escanaba License Group (ELG), a company owned by Lyle R. Evans, a Green Bay, Wisconsin, broadcast engineer who was involved in several radio or TV stations in Wisconsin and Michigan, including the founding of television station WLRE-TV there. In its early incarnation, WMXG broadcast as "Mix 106," launching with a hot adult contemporary music format that included some rock during its early months. By fall 2006, "Mix 106" converted to a classic hits format, with some modern rock songs included during evening hours. The station left the air, at the time of Lyle Evans death. Evans Estate still owes the IRS over one million dollars in unpaid taxes, as well as liens from the State of Michigan.

On April 25, 2012, a failure forced WMXG off the air, for the last time. Two months later, ELG would request and receive from the FCC the first of what would be a series of Special Temporary Authority (STA) waivers to keep WMXG off the air. WMXG would briefly return to the air with rock music in April 2013, meeting the first STA's extended expiration date (extended for financial reasons). After that, WMXG would return to the air periodically, with ELG seeking new STAs from the FCC and citing WMXG's continued transmitter problems, the station's "next-to-nonexistent business" (the station's Escanaba offices were believed to have been locked and unoccupied), and failed efforts to resolve the estate of Lyle Evans (who died in March 2006) and seek new ownership for the station. Had ELG not returned WMXG to the air before the deadlines stipulated in the STAs, even if only temporarily, the station's license would have faced automatic expiration.

On March 13, 2017, it was announced that WMXG would be sold to Armada Media Corporation, with the station joining the Armada-owned Radio Results Network (RRN) of radio stations in central Upper Michigan. While awaiting the sales process to be completed, Armada would bring WMXG back to the air under a local marketing agreement, having the station temporarily simulcast news/talk station WCHT (AM 600) and hinting at "exciting plans" for WMXG in the coming months. On April 3, 2017, after a brief stunting period with Elvis Presley music, WMXG unveiled a new classic country format branded as "Maverick 106." Similar to the branding and format of RRN's station in the Manistique area (WTIQ AM 1490), the new "Maverick" format on WMXG emphasizes country songs and artists from the 1970s through 1990s, and serves as a "flanker" to RRN's contemporary country station in Escanaba, WCMM (102.5 FM). On January 29, 2018, the sale was consummated at a price of $325,000. Armada changed the station's call sign to WGMV on May 3, 2018.
