= Armada Media Corporation =

American radio station operator

Armada Media Corporation is a Wisconsin-based media corporation founded in 2006 that owns radio stations in the Midwestern United States. Armada Media operates in small unrated markets. Armada Media is based in Fond du Lac and operates 28 radio stations and 2 translators in South Dakota, Wisconsin, the Upper Peninsula of Michigan, Nebraska, Kansas, Minnesota and Colorado.

Armada Media's Board of Directors includes former Wisconsin Governor Tommy Thompson, Terry Shockley, Chris Bernier, John Lynch, and Bob Bourke. Bernier also serves as the company's CEO. Investment banker Bob Bourke is the CFO. Jim Coursolle is the founder and former CEO of Armada, but resigned and left the company in March 2008.

Armada Media was sued by Wells Fargo Foothill Inc. in 2010 for defaulting on a $16.2 million loan.

== Radio stations ==
Armada Media is the sole shareholder of radio station clusters based in McCook, Nebraska, and Michigan's Upper Peninsula.

=== Armada Media – McCook ===
Armada Media acquired High Plains Radio of McCook, Nebraska in 2007.

Armada McCook Stations
Frequency	Call sign	Name	Format	City of license	Target City
98.5 FM	KHAQ	98.5 The Hawk	Classic Rock	Maxwell, NE	North Platte, NE
104.3 FM	KXNP	KX 104	Country	North Platte, NE	North Platte, NE
1240 AM	KODY	News/Talk 1240	News/Talk	North Platte, NE	North Platte, NE
102.9 FM	KADL	Hometown Radio	Classic Hits	Imperial, NE	Imperial, NE
96.1 FM	KICX	Kicks 96	Adult Contemporary	McCook, NE	McCook, NE
103.9 FM	KQHK	103.9 The Hawk	Classic Rock	McCook, NE	McCook, NE
1300 AM	KBRL	The Big Talker	News/Talk	McCook, NE	McCook, NE
101.1 FM	KFNF	Today's Best Country	Country	Oberlin, KS	Oberlin, KS
92.3 FM	KSTH	Star 92.3	Adult Contemporary	Holyoke, CO	Holyoke, CO
96.5 FM	KJBL	Oldies 96.5	Oldies	Julesburg, CO	Julesburg, CO

=== Armada Media – Escanaba ===
Armada Media acquired four stations from Radioactive, LLC on March 27, 2020.

Armada Escanaba Stations
Frequency	Call sign	Name	Format	City of license	Target City
107.3 FM	WUPF	The Eagle 107.3	Classic Rock	Powers, MI	Escanaba, MI
96.7 FM	WUPG	The Maverick	Classic Country	Republic, MI	Marquette, MI
100.3 FM	WUPT	The Point 100.3	Classic Hits	Gwinn, MI	Marquette, MI
94.9 FM	WUPZ	94.9 The Bay	Top 40	Chocolay Township, MI	Marquette, MI

=== Armada Media – Scottsbluff ===
Armada Media acquired Bluffs Broadcasting of Scottsbluff, Nebraska on May 1, 2013. The four stations were all subsequently sold to Nebraska Rural Radio Association effective January 17, 2020.

=== Armada Media – Watertown ===
Armada Media purchased four radio stations from Big Stone and Pheasant Country Broadcasting in 2007. The stations were all subsequently sold to Prairie Winds Broadcasting, Inc. effective August 30, 2019.

== Previously-owned stations ==
- KBWS-FM (102.9 FM, Sisseton, SD)
- KDIO (1350 AM, Ortonville, MN)
- KETT (99.3 FM, Mitchell, NE)
- KHYY (106.9 FM, Scottsbluff, NE)
- KJKQ (99.5 FM, Sisseton, SD)
- KMOR (93.3 FM, Gering, NE)
- KMSD (1510 AM, Milbank, SD)
- KOAQ (1320 AM, Scottsbluff, NE)
- KOLT (690 AM, Terrytown, NE)
- KPHR (106.3 FM, Ortonville, MN)
- K252FB (98.3 FM, Milbank, SD)
