= WUPZ =

Coordinates: 46.514°N 87.478°W

- Chocolay Charter Township, Michigan; United States
- Broadcast area: Marquette, Michigan
- Frequency: 94.9 MHz
- Branding: 94.9 The Bay

Programming
- Format: Top 40 (CHR)
- Affiliations: Fox News Radio

Ownership
- Owner: Armada Media Corporation; (AMC Partners Escanaba, LLC)

History
- First air date: May 2009 (licensed 9/29/2006)
- Former call signs: WUPG (2006–2008)
- Call sign meaning: Upper Peninsula

Technical information
- Licensing authority: FCC
- Facility ID: 164243
- Class: C1
- ERP: 100,000 watts
- HAAT: 156 meters

Links
- Public license information: Public file; LMS
- Webcast: Listen Live
- Website: WUPZ Online

WUPZ (94.9 FM) is a radio station licensed to Chocolay Charter Township, Michigan serving the Marquette, Michigan market. The station is currently owned by Armada Media Corporation, through licensee AMC Partners Escanaba, LLC, doing business as the Radio Results Network and broadcasts from studios on Ridge Street in Marquette.

The station is branded as 94.9 The Bay with a Top 40 (CHR) format. WUPZ has a rhythmic lean to it, differentiating itself from Hot Adult Contemporary sister station WGLQ. WUPZ is the Packers Radio Network for Marquette County.

== Technical Details ==
The transmitting antenna for WUPZ is located on a private third-party leased tower located near Marquette County Road 492 approximately 3 miles east-southeast of the city of Marquette, Michigan. The antenna is mounted at 325-feet on the tower. The tower itself is situated atop a local hill which gives the transmitter a total height above average terrain (HAAT) of 512-feet. The station broadcasts a standard FM analog signal and does not offer digital programming.

As is typical of class C1 stations, the transmitter broadcasts at 100,000 watts effective radiated power (ERP) which, under normal atmospheric conditions, covers approximately 65 radial miles. The station can typically be received as far south as Escanaba, Michigan, as far west as L'Anse, Michigan, and as far east as Seney, Michigan.

The station is licensed through the Federal Communications Commission. The current license expires on October 1, 2028.

== History ==
The station was first granted its license on September 29, 2006 under the ownership of Radioactive, LLC (a holding company owned by Randy Michaels) and signed on under this ownership in May 2009 with a Top 40 (CHR) format. WUPZ has a rhythmic lean to it. The station air staff includes Jason Lee, Cory Lane, Kirk Sanders and Jon Perrault.

The station was sold to Armada Media Corporation as part of a four station sale in late 2016. (Stations also sold under this arrangement included sister stations WUPG, WUPT, and WUPF.) The station slogan "94.9 The Bay" alongside its current station logo was adopted as part of the station's acquisition by Armada Media Corporation in 2016.
