= WTIQ =

Coordinates: 45°57′51″N 86°16′37″W

- Manistique, Michigan; United States
- Broadcast area
- Frequency: 1490 kHz
- Branding: 98.5 & 1490 The Maverick

Programming
- Format: Classic Country
- Affiliations: Classic Country (Local Radio Network); Michigan Radio Network

Ownership
- Owner: AMC Partners, LLC; (AMC Partners Escanaba, LLC)

History
- First air date: February 11, 1965
- Call sign meaning: ManisTIQue, Michigan

Technical information
- Licensing authority: FCC
- Facility ID: 73992
- Class: C
- Power: 1,000 watts unlimited
- Translator: 98.5 W253CG (Manistique)

Links
- Public license information: Public file; LMS
- Webcast: Listen Live
- Website: 98.5 & 1490 The Maverick Online

WTIQ (1490 AM) is a radio station licensed to Manistique, Michigan broadcasting a classic country format. The station broadcasts programming from Local Radio Network's customizers classic country programming.

== History ==
WTIQ began broadcasting February 11, 1965 at 1490 kHz with a power of 1,000 watts daytime, 250 watts nighttime, non-directional. The station was built by David M. Kelly and Edmund Selleck, equal partners in Manistique Broadcasting Company. Both Kelly and Selleck moved to Manistique from Detroit to build and operate the station. Kelly had sold his interest in WLIN, licensed to Lincoln Park, Michigan to Hy Levinson, owner of WCAR, the previous year. Selleck was employed by Kelly as a part-time announcer at WLIN. WTIQ operated from 6 am until 10 pm daily featuring a variety of music, local news, local sports (including play-by-play), weather reports and AP state and national news. Kelly purchased Selleck's interest in WTIQ in 1969. During Kelly's ownership, WTIQ initiated the CBC Radiothon as a fundraising effort to support three local charities. That event continues to be sponsored by WTIQ. On May 23, 1973, David Kelly sold WTIQ to Doug Tjapkes, a broadcaster from Grand Haven, Michigan, who operated the station until 1982.

On June 28, 1982, WTIQ was again purchased, this time by Frances Jo Curtis, a local area business woman. On July 9, 1986 the FCC issued a construction permit for WTIQ-FM to broadcast at 94.7 MHz. The CP, also owned by Curtis through American Peakes Ltd. was licensed to Gulliver, Michigan. Curtis sold the Manistique and the Gulliver CP to WSHN Inc. on December 24, 1990. Principles were Stu Noordyk CEO and Todd Noordyk, General Manager. The FM was built out in late 1991 and went on the air in 1992 as WCMM.

Under another company, Great Lakes Radio, Todd Noordyk sold the stations to Lakes Radio on November 11, 1999. Lakes Radio, based in Rice Lake, Wisconsin, is headed by Tom Kozer. On December 17, 2014, employees were told the station group was being sold to Armada Media, a Wisconsin-based broadcasting company with holdings in South Dakota, Nebraska, Wisconsin and Michigan. The sale of WTIQ to AMC Partners, LLC, along with sister stations WCHT, WCMM, WGKL, and WGLQ, closed on March 30, 2015 at a price of $1.8 million.

The station broadcasts from the original co-located studio and transmitter site on West Highway 442. The original building was added on to by Kelly and Selleck in 1966 and has been remodeled and expanded several times during the station's history.

On November 16, 2015 WTIQ changed their format from oldies to classic country, branded as "The Maverick".
