= WNMU-FM =

Public radio station in Marquette, Michigan

Coordinates: 46.352°N 87.859°W

- Marquette, Michigan; United States
- Broadcast area
- Frequency: 90.1 MHz
- Branding: Public Radio 90

Programming
- Format: Public: Variety - including Classical, Jazz, News/Talk
- Affiliations: NPR

Ownership
- Owner: Northern Michigan University

History
- First air date: 1963
- Former call signs: WNMR (1963–1975)
- Call sign meaning: Northern Michigan University

Technical information
- Licensing authority: FCC
- Facility ID: 49572
- Class: C1
- ERP: 100,000 watts
- HAAT: 283 meters (928 ft)

Links
- Public license information: Public file; LMS
- Webcast: Listen live
- Website: www.wnmufm.org

WNMU-FM is a radio station in the United States, broadcasting at FM 90.1 in Marquette, Michigan. The station, owned by Northern Michigan University, is a National Public Radio member station, airing a large amount of classical and jazz music along with a variety of other local programming. It is operated by a combination of full-time staff members and students.

The station serves the Upper Peninsula and northeastern Wisconsin. It first signed on in 1963 as WNMR. It joined the then year-old NPR in 1971 and adopted its current calls in 1975.

WNMU-FM is licensed to broadcast in HD Radio, but opted to temporarily discontinue HD broadcasting in the spring of 2011 due to financial constraints. The station had planned to launch HD-2 and HD-3 side channels, one featuring entirely classical music and the other featuring entirely public radio news and information. It had been the only Upper Peninsula radio station licensed for HD transmissions.

== Translators ==
WNMU-FM programming can also be heard on the following translator stations across the Upper Peninsula:

Broadcast translator for WNMU-FM
Call sign	Frequency	City of license	FID	FCC info
W220AJ	91.9 FM	Manistique, MI	4263	LMS
W243CQ	96.5 FM	Escanaba, MI	4262	LMS
W250BO	97.9 FM	Stephenson, MI	77599	LMS

NOTE: W243CQ previously operated as W296AX on 107.1 FM. The translator changed frequencies due to the sign-on of 107.3 WUPF in Powers, Michigan, which serves the Escanaba area. Similarly, the Stephenson translator, which originally operated at 107.3, was forced off the air in July 2009 by the sign-on on WUPF. The translator received construction permits to move to 96.7 and 97.3, but transmission on those frequencies would have presented interference to WUPG 96.7 FM in Republic, Michigan, and WGLQ 97.1 FM in Escanaba, respectively. In June 2011, the translator was granted a construction permit to operate on 97.9, where it would not interfere in the protected coverage areas of any full-powered stations. That translator is now on the air at 97.9.

Also, WNMU previously operated two other translators:

- Newberry, Michigan at 91.1 FM (W216AI). The license for this translator was cancelled on June 17, 2020.
- Menominee, Michigan at 91.3 FM (W217AA). As of May 2012, the license for this translator has been cancelled, due to the sign-on of WRMW, a full-power station on the same frequency in nearby Peshtigo, Wisconsin.

WNMU's signal normally does not reach Sault Ste. Marie (although the W216AI translator formerly served that area). That city is instead served by Central Michigan University's public/NPR/jazz station WCMU-FM, via its local repeater WCMZ.
