= 100.3 The Point =

100.3 The Point may refer to either of the following radio stations:

- WKBE, a Modern Rock radio station in Warrensburg, New York
- WUPT (FM), a Classic Hits radio station in Gwinn, Michigan
