= WNMU =

WNMU may refer to:

- WNMU (TV) (channel 8, virtual 13), a PBS-member station in Marquette, Michigan, owned by Northern Michigan University
- WNMU-FM 90.1 a National Public Radio member station in Marquette, co-owned with WNMU television
- Western New Mexico University
