= WYKX =

Coordinates: 45.928°N 87.267°W

- Escanaba, Michigan; United States
- Broadcast area
- Frequency: 104.7 MHz
- Branding: The U.P.'s Country - Kix 104.7

Programming
- Format: Country
- Affiliations: Westwood One; Detroit Lions Radio Network

Ownership
- Owner: Todd Mohr; (Aurora Media, LLC)
- Sister stations: WDBC

History
- First air date: December 20, 1977 (48 years ago)
- Former call signs: WFNN (1977–1983)
- Call sign meaning: KiX Country

Technical information
- Licensing authority: FCC
- Facility ID: 35116
- Class: C1
- ERP: 100,000 watts
- HAAT: 107 meters
- Translator: 103.9 W280GB (Escanaba)

Links
- Public license information: Public file; LMS
- Website: escanabaradiogroup.com

WYKX (104.7 FM) is a radio station broadcasting a country music format. Licensed to Escanaba, Michigan, it first began broadcasting in December 20, 1977 under the WFNN call sign that call sign today is used at a radio station in Erie Pennsylvania. It is locally owned and operated by Todd Mohr, through licensee Aurora Media, LLC, along with adult standards sister station WDBC 680 AM.

In the late 1970s and early 1980s, WFNN was "Fun 104," an automated Top 40 station. Most programming was separate from WDBC, with a few exceptions including simulcasts of Casey Kasem's American Top 40. Following the debut of WGLQ in 1982, the station switched to its current calls and format.

WYKX belongs to the Detroit Lions radio network and broadcasts every regular season home and away game for the central UP. The broadcast range is from Menominee to Marquette and Iron Mountain to Manistique. It can also be heard across Lake Michigan in parts of northern Lower Michigan, around Leland and Frankfort.

The Morning Show is hosted weekdays from 6-10 A.M. with Arthur Wyman.

Previous logo

== Sources ==
- Michiguide.com - WYKX History
