= WUPG =

Coordinates: 46.508°N 87.969°W

- Republic, Michigan; United States
- Broadcast area: Ishpeming, Michigan
- Frequency: 96.7 MHz
- Branding: Maverick 96

Programming
- Format: Classic Country

Ownership
- Owner: Armada Media Corporation; (AMC Partners Escanaba, LLC)

History
- First air date: April 17, 2008
- Former call signs: WUPZ (9/29/06-06/10/08)
- Call sign meaning: Upper Peninsula

Technical information
- Licensing authority: FCC
- Facility ID: 164246
- Class: C2
- ERP: 50,000 watts
- HAAT: 104 meters (341 ft)

Links
- Public license information: Public file; LMS
- Website: Maverick Country 96.7

WUPG (formerly WUPZ) (96.7 FM) is a radio station licensed to Republic, Michigan. The station is currently owned by Armada Media Corporation, through licensee AMC Partners Escanaba, LLC (d.b.a. The Radio Results Network or "RRN"). The station first signed on in July 2008 with a Variety Hits format but is now a Classic Country format station. In 2017, the station changed their brand to "The Maverick", using the same brand as sister stations WTIQ and WGMV.

== Technical Details ==
The primary transmitting antenna for WUPG is located on a tower which sits approximately 0.5 miles (0.80 km) south of Champion, Michigan on U.S. Highway 41. The transmitter is mounted at the top of the tower which is 58 meters (190 ft) tall. The tower itself sits on a large natural hill which gives the transmitter an average height above local terrain (HAAT) of 104 meters (341 ft). The antenna broadcasts at an effective radiated power (ERP) of 50,000 watts and, under typical atmospheric conditions, covers an approximate radial distance of 45 miles (72 km). The station can typically be received as far south as Iron Mountain, Michigan, as far east as Au Train Township, Michigan and as far west as Greenland Township, Michigan, and as far north as Houghton, Michigan.

The station has a class D booster transmitter which is co-located on sister station WDMJ's tower on Tower Road in Marquette Township. The booster transmitter broadcasts with 100 watts effective radiated power (ERP) in a non-directional pattern. The booster is primarily used to reinforce reception of the station within the lowest elevation areas of the greater Marquette City, as the station's signal often degrades quickly in this area due to the unique local geography.

The station broadcasts a standard FM analog signal with no digital signaling or programming.

== History ==
The station was originally created in early 2006 under the ownership of Radioactive, LLC (a holding company owned by Randy Michaels). It was granted its initial license on September 29, 2006 and went on the air shortly thereafter under the callsign WUPZ. The station began operations as a Variety Hits format station. On June 10, 2008, the station switched its callsign to WUPG (the ownership company deciding to assign WUPZ to a nearby sister station). On March 4, 2014 the station switched its format to Classic Country. Along with the format switch came use of the catchphrase "Yooper Country 96.7", a new logo, and the new booster transmitting antenna on the station studio building rooftop at the 700 block of West Washington Street in Marquette, Michigan.

In 2016, the station was sold alongside four other sister stations (including WUPZ, WUPT, and WUPF) to Armada Media Corporation (a holding company of Chris Bernier). Shortly after this sale, the station adopted "Maverick 96" as its catchphrase, relocated its studio to another office in Marquette, Michigan, and moved the booster transmitter to leased space on a separate local antenna tower.

== Sources ==
- Michiguide.com - WUPG History
- Insider Radio - Armada Media Gets Four Radioactive MI Stations
- Radio-Locator - WUPG-FM 96.7 MHz
- Radio-Locator - WUPG-1-FM 96.7 MHz
