= WUPT (FM) =

- Gwinn, Michigan; United States
- Broadcast area: Marquette, Michigan
- Frequency: 100.3 MHz
- Branding: 100.3 The Point

Programming
- Format: Classic hits

Ownership
- Owner: Armada Media Corporation; (AMC Partners Escanaba, LLC)

History
- First air date: 2008
- Former call signs: WUPF (2006–2008, CP)
- Call sign meaning: Upper Peninsula

Technical information
- Licensing authority: FCC
- Facility ID: 164244
- Class: C1
- ERP: 100,000 watts
- HAAT: 156 meters (512 ft)
- Transmitter coordinates: 46°30′51.5″N 87°28′40.8″W

Links
- Public license information: Public file; LMS
- Webcast: Listen Live
- Website: WUPT Online

WUPT (100.3 FM, "100.3 The Point") is a radio station broadcasting a classic hits music format. Licensed to Gwinn, Michigan. The station is currently owned by Armada Media Corporation, through licensee AMC Partners Escanaba, LLC. (d.b.a. the Radio Results Network). Current station staff include Dave Starr (host of Fresh Coast Mornings), Cara Carrivous, Mike Smith, and Tim Jeffreys.

== Technical Details ==
The transmitting antenna for WUPT is co-located on a private leased tower located near Marquette County Road 492 approximately 3 miles (4.8 km) east-southeast of the city of Marquette, Michigan. WUPT shares its transmitting tower with WUPZ, one of its sister stations. The antenna is mounted at 325 feet (99 m) on the tower. The tower itself is situated atop a local hill which gives the transmitter a total height above average terrain (HAAT) of 512 feet (156 m).

The station transmitting antenna broadcasts at 100,000 watts effective radiated power (ERP) which, under normal atmospheric conditions, covers an approximate radius of 65 miles (105 km). The station can typically be received as far south as Escanaba, Michigan, as far west as L'Anse, Michigan, and as far east as Seney, Michigan.

== History ==
Under the ownership of Radioactive, LLC (a holding company owned by Randy Michaels), the Federal Communications Commission issued a construction permit for the station on June 9, 2005. The station was assigned the call sign WUPF on September 29, 2006. It received its license to cover on July 29, 2008 and began broadcasting shortly thereafter. On August 7, 2008, the station changed its call sign to the current WUPT.

In late 2016, the station was one of four stations (the others being WUPG, WUPF, and WUPZ) that were sold to Armada Media Corporation (a holding company owned by Chris Bernier). Shortly after the sale, the studio was moved into the Radio Results Network Marquette office on Ridge Street in Marquette, Michigan and became a member station of the Radio Results Network portfolio.

Currently, WUPT airs a Classic Hits music format and is the flagship station for Northern Michigan University Sports.
