= WGKL =

Coordinates: 45.805°N 87.171°W

- Gladstone, Michigan; United States
- Broadcast area
- Frequency: 105.5 MHz
- Branding: Kool 105.5

Programming
- Format: Classic hits

Ownership
- Owner: AMC Partners, LLC; (AMC Partners Escanaba, LLC)

History
- First air date: 1999
- Former call signs: WCLS (?-5/1/98); WWTM (?-?)
- Call sign meaning: W G KooL 105.5

Technical information
- Licensing authority: FCC
- Facility ID: 86354
- Class: C3
- ERP: 10,000 watts
- HAAT: 115 meters

Links
- Public license information: Public file; LMS
- Webcast: Listen Live
- Website: WGKL Online

WGKL (105.5 FM, "Kool 105.5") is a classic hits radio station licensed to Gladstone, Michigan, with a power output of 10,000 watts, covering the greater Delta County area. The station is owned by Armada Media Corporation, through licensee AMC Partners Escanaba, LLC, doing business as the Radio Results Network and broadcasts from studios on Ludington Street in Escanaba, Michigan.

== Programming ==
WGKL has a classic hits format, playing music from the 1970s through 1990s. Personalities include Mike Daniels, Marc Hunter, and Tommy Kay. Weekends include syndicated music shows and local oldies program Weekend Gold hosted by Mike Daniels. Most hours begin with a Fox News Radio update, local news, and weather.

== Technical Details ==
WGKL broadcasts from a tower in Escanaba Township just off of 18th Road approximately 5 miles northwest of Escanaba, Michigan. The transmitter broadcasts with an effective radiated power (ERP) of 10,000 watts in an omnidirectional pattern. The transmitter is mounted at the top of the tower which stands at 104 meters (341 ft) atop a slight hill which gives the transmitter a height above average terrain (HAAT) of 115 meters (377 ft). The station has a typical coverage radius of approximately 50 miles (80 km).

== History ==
The station was formed under the ownership of Lakes Radio, Inc. (owners of WGLQ and WCHT) in early 1999. A broadcast license was granted by the Federal Communications Commission for station operations on November 11, 1999, and the station signed-on the air shortly thereafter broadcasting a classic hits format.

In late 2015, WGKL and four other stations were sold to Armada Media Corporation (AMC) Partners, LLC and added to their list of stations operated under the Radio Results Network operating group.
