= KBWS-FM =

- Sisseton, South Dakota; United States
- Frequency: 102.9 MHz
- Branding: Superstar Country B103

Programming
- Format: Country

Ownership
- Owner: Prairie Winds Broadcasting, Inc.
- Sister stations: KDIO, KMSD, KPHR, KJKQ

History
- First air date: December 15, 1983

Technical information
- Licensing authority: FCC
- Facility ID: 36355
- Class: C1
- ERP: 100,000 watts
- HAAT: 140 meters (460 feet)
- Transmitter coordinates: 45°36′52″N 97°24′51″W

Links
- Public license information: Public file; LMS
- Webcast: Listen Live
- Website: Official Website

KBWS-FM (102.9 FM, "Superstar Country B103") is a radio station licensed to serve Sisseton, South Dakota. The station is owned by Prairie Winds Broadcasting. It airs a country music format.

The station was assigned the KBWS-FM call letters by the Federal Communications Commission on December 15, 1983.

== Ownership ==
In 2004 as part of a reorganization by the Ingstad family, Aberdeen Radio Ranch Inc. (Robert J. Ingstad, co-president) agreed to acquire KGIM, KGIM-FM, KNBZ, and KQKD from Robert E. Ingstad (Pheasant Country Broadcasting). The transaction price was not disclosed. KBWS-FM was retained by Pheasant Country Broadcasting with an agreement to be operated by Ingstad owned Big Stone Broadcasting.

In August 2007, Armada Media Corporation agreed to purchase the assets of radio stations KMSD-AM, KBWS-FM, KDIO-AM and KPHR-FM from Big Stone Broadcasting, Inc., and Pheasant Country Broadcasting, Inc for $2.9 million.

Effective August 30, 2019, Armada Media sold KBWS-FM, five sister stations, and a translator to Prairie Winds Broadcasting, Inc. for a total price of $1.5 million

== Programming and history ==
KBWS-FM signed on the air in December, 1983. Its frequency was 102.9 and as it was prior to the advent of digital radios, it was branded as B103. The original format was a board based Adult Contemporary…encompassing everything from pop-country to lighter Top 40.

The studios and tower site were located in the small town of Eden, South Dakota. As a 100KW FM station, KBWS served Northeast South Dakota, West Central Minnesota, and Southeast North Dakota. It was originally owned by the publishers of the newspapers in Sisseton, Britton, and Webster, South Dakota. Mark Murray and Steve Collin’s were two of the original disk jockeys.

Due to owners Pheasant Country Broadcasting's launch of 100,000 watt KGIM-FM "Pheasant Country 103" in the Aberdeen, South Dakota market, KBWS-FM was rebranded Pheasant Country 103 and aired a simulcast of KGIM-FM's programming (excluding a local show from 6am-10am). This simulcast was ended in the fall of 2004 due to a reorganization by the Ingstad family. KBWS-FM now airs exclusively local programming derived from its Sisseton, South Dakota studio.

In the late 90s, KBWS-FM moved its studios from its Eden, South Dakota tower site to its current studio location on Veterans Avenue in Sisseton, South Dakota.
