= WDBC =

Coordinates: 45°45′47″N 87°05′41″W

- Escanaba, Michigan; United States
- Broadcast area: (Daytime) (Nighttime)
- Frequency: 680 kHz
- Branding: 94.5 FM & AM 680 WDBC

Programming
- Format: Soft adult contemporary, news, talk
- Affiliations: Compass Media Networks; Genesis Communications Network; United Stations Radio Networks; Westwood One; Detroit Tigers Radio Network; Michigan IMG Sports Network

Ownership
- Owner: Todd Mohr; (Aurora Media, LLC)
- Sister stations: WYKX

History
- First air date: 1941 (at 1490)
- Former frequencies: 1490 kHz (1941–1950)

Technical information
- Licensing authority: FCC
- Facility ID: 35115
- Class: B
- Power: 6,000 watts day 1,000 watts night
- Translator: 94.5 W233CT (Escanaba)

Links
- Public license information: Public file; LMS
- Website: escanabaradiogroup.com

WDBC (680 AM) is a radio station licensed to Escanaba, Michigan, broadcasting a full-service format featuring news, talk and adult contemporary music.

WDBC is Upper Michigan's most powerful AM radio station in terms of signal strength; its 10,000-watt daytime signal can be heard from Iron River in the west to St. Ignace in the east, and as far away as Manitowoc, Wisconsin, and Manistee, Michigan. On November 17, 2016, WDBC was granted a Federal Communications Commission construction permit to decrease day power to 6,000 watts.

== FM Translator ==
Broadcast translator for WDBC
Call sign	Frequency	City of license	FID	ERP (W)	Class	FCC info
W233CT	94.5 FM	Escanaba, Michigan	203228	250	D	LMS

WDBC has broadcast a variety of popular music formats over the years. In the 1970s, it was a Top 40 music station and an affiliate of Casey Kasem's American Top 40 countdown show. In the 1980s and into the early 1990s, the station played Adult contemporary music. The station later went oldies and then standards, using the Music of Your Life format and then Jones Radio Networks' Jones Standards.

On September 30, 2008, Jones Radio Network discontinued Jones Standards following its purchase by Triton Media Group, owner of the Dial Global stable of 24/7 formats. Like many other Jones Standards outlets, WDBC switched over to Dial Global's "Adult Standards" (America's Best Music) network.

At midnight on February 10, 2020, WDBC discontinued Dial Global's "Adult Standards" (America's Best Music) network in favor of a format which included a mixture of adult standards and more contemporary music.
