= KMSD =

- Milbank, South Dakota; United States
- Broadcast area: Watertown, South Dakota
- Frequency: 1510 kHz
- Branding: 95.1 & 1510 KMSD

Programming
- Format: Classic hits
- Affiliations: Fox News Radio

Ownership
- Owner: Prairie Winds Broadcasting, Inc.
- Sister stations: KBWS-FM, KDIO, KPHR, KJKQ

History
- First air date: September 21, 1977
- Call sign meaning: K Milbank South Dakota

Technical information
- Licensing authority: FCC
- Facility ID: 63599
- Class: D
- Power: 5,000 watts day 1,000 watts critical hours 14 watts night
- Transmitter coordinates: 45°11′39.9″N 96°38′22.2″W
- Translator: 95.1 K236CU (Milbank)

Links
- Public license information: Public file; LMS
- Webcast: Listen Live
- Website: KMSD Online

KMSD (1510 AM) is a radio station licensed to serve Milbank, South Dakota. The station is owned by Prairie Winds Broadcasting. It airs a classic hits format. In 2012, the station was listed as an affiliate of the Minnesota Vikings radio network, however it no longer carries their games. The Vikings games can now be heard on sister station KPHR.

KMSD is an affiliate of the South Dakota State University Jackrabbits football team.

== History ==
Initially, a construction permit was issued for KMSD in 1974. Its call sign was assigned the same year. The station signed on the air on September 21, 1977. It was owned by Sturgis Radio Inc. The station was licensed for 5,000 watts during the day only, with 1,000 watts for critical hours. The transmitter was located 1.5 miles (2 km) south of Milbank, near South Dakota Highway 15.

In the 1980s, the station was owned by Kleven Broadcasting and sold to KSOR Inc. for $450,000. It was sold again to Midland Communications.

On June 18, 1999, Success Broadcasting Corporation transferred its license of KMSD to Pheasant Country Broadcasting, Inc.

On October 6, 1999, Pheasant Country Broadcasting, Inc agreed to transfer the assets of KMSD to Big Stone Broadcasting, Inc.

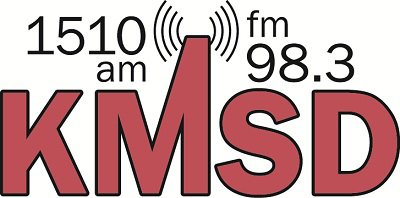
Logo under previous translator

On August 3, 2007, Armada Media-Watertown, Inc. agreed to purchase the assets of radio stations KMSD, KBWS-FM, KDIO and KPHR-FM from Big Stone Broadcasting, Inc., and Pheasant Country Broadcasting, Inc for $2.9 million.

On June 25, 2019, Armada Media sold KMSD, four sister stations, and a translator to Prairie Winds Broadcasting for a total price of $1.5 million The sale was consummated on August 30, 2019.

== Programming ==
KMSD's current programming consists of Classic Hits/News/Talk. KMSD started to broadcast on FM translator K252FB 98.3 FM in February 2012. In late 2020, KMSD switched their FM simulcast from K252FB 98.3 to K236CU 95.1. KMSD broadcasts Milbank High School Football and both Milbank girls' and boys' basketball, along with Legion baseball.
