= WUPF =

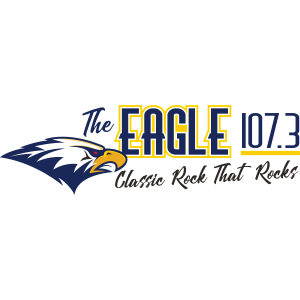
- Powers, Michigan; United States
- Broadcast area: Escanaba, Michigan
- Frequency: 107.3 MHz
- Branding: Eagle 107.3

Programming
- Format: Classic rock

Ownership
- Owner: Armada Media Corporation; (AMC Partners Escanaba, LLC)
- Sister stations: WUPG, WUPT, WUPZ

History
- First air date: March 2, 2008
- Former call signs: WXPT (2006–2008)
- Call sign meaning: Upper Peninsula

Technical information
- Licensing authority: FCC
- Facility ID: 164245
- Class: C2
- ERP: 50,000 watts
- HAAT: 97 meters
- Transmitter coordinates: 45°42′39″N 87°20′49″W

Links
- Public license information: Public file; LMS
- Webcast: Listen Live
- Website: Eagle 107.3 Online

WUPF (107.3 FM / RF channel 297) is a radio station licensed to Powers, Michigan and currently broadcasts a classic rock format as "Eagle 107.3 FM". The station is owned by Armada Media Corporation, through licensee AMC Partners Escanaba, LLC (d.b.a. Radio Results Network). The station first signed on in September, 2008 with a variety hits format. As of late 2016, the station operates under a classic rock format.

== Technical Details ==
The WUPF transmitting antenna is located on a private tower on Veeser Road in Harris Township, Michigan (approximately 12 miles (19 km) east of Escanaba, Michigan). The antenna is mounted at the top of the tower which stands at 114 meters (374 ft). The tower itself sits atop a slight hill giving the antenna an average height above local terrain (HAAT) of 130 meters (430 ft). The antenna broadcasts at an effective radiated power (ERP) of 50,000 watts giving the station an approximate radial coverage distance of 45 miles (72 km) under typical atmospheric conditions. The station can typically be received as far south as Sturgeon Bay, Wisconsin, as far east as Manistique, Michigan and as far north as Gwinn, Michigan.

== History ==
The station was created in 2005 under the ownership of Radioactive, LLC (a holding company owned by Randy Michaels). The Federal Communications Commission issued a construction permit for the station on March 9, 2005. The station was assigned the callsign WXPT on October 2, 2006 and received its broadcast license on June 27, 2008. Shortly before beginning on-air operations, the station changed its callsign to WUPF on August 7, 2008.

In late 2016, the station was one of four stations (the others being WUPG, WUPZ, and WUPT) that were sold to Armada Media Corporation (a holding company owned by Chris Bernier). After the sale, the station studio was moved into the Radio Results Network building on Ludington Street in Escanaba, Michigan and was brought under the operating umbrella of the Radio Results Network.
