= KJKQ =

- Sisseton, South Dakota; United States
- Broadcast area: Sisseton, South Dakota
- Frequency: 99.5 MHz
- Branding: 99.5 Jack FM

Programming
- Format: Adult hits
- Affiliations: Fox News Radio; Jack FM network

Ownership
- Owner: Prairie Winds Broadcasting, Inc.
- Sister stations: KDIO, KMSD, KPHR, KBWS

History
- First air date: February 13, 2013

Technical information
- Licensing authority: FCC
- Facility ID: 183354
- Class: C2
- ERP: 25,000 watts
- HAAT: 170 meters (558 feet)
- Transmitter coordinates: 45°39′50″N 97°10′08″W

Links
- Public license information: Public file; LMS
- Webcast: Listen Live
- Website: Official Website

KJKQ (99.5 FM, "Jack FM") is a radio station licensed to serve Sisseton, South Dakota. The station is owned by Prairie Winds Broadcasting, Inc. It airs an adult hits format.

The station was assigned the KJKQ call letters by the Federal Communications Commission on September 10, 2012.
