= KPHR =

- Ortonville, Minnesota; United States
- Broadcast area: Watertown, South Dakota
- Frequency: 106.3 MHz (HD Radio)
- Branding: Power 106.3

Programming
- Format: Classic rock
- Subchannels: HD2: Soft adult contemporary "Star 98.1"
- Affiliations: United Stations Radio Networks; Minnesota Vikings

Ownership
- Owner: Prairie Winds Broadcasting, Inc.
- Sister stations: KBWS-FM, KMSD, KDIO, KJKQ

History
- First air date: 1997

Technical information
- Licensing authority: FCC
- Facility ID: 67753
- Class: C1
- ERP: 100,000 watts
- HAAT: 291 meters
- Transmitter coordinates: 45°06′17″N 96°59′17″W
- Translator: HD2: 98.1 K251CX (Milbank, South Dakota)

Links
- Public license information: Public file; LMS
- Webcast: Listen Live; Listen Live (HD2)
- Website: KPHR Onlibe; Star 98.1 (HD2)

KPHR (106.3 FM, "Power 106.3") is a radio station licensed to Ortonville, Minnesota serving the Watertown, South Dakota area. The station airs a classic rock format and is owned by Prairie Winds Broadcasting, Inc. The station broadcasts using HD Radio. It carries a soft adult contemporary format on HD-2, known as Star 98.1.

== Ownership ==
On August 3, 2007, KPHR was acquired by Armada Media as part of a 4 station purchase for a total price of $2.9 million.

On June 25, 2019, Armada Media sold KPHR, four sister stations, and a translator to Prairie Winds Broadcasting for a total price of $1.5 million The sale was consummated on August 30, 2019.
