= KDIO =

- Ortonville, Minnesota; United States
- Frequency: 1350 kHz
- Branding: 1350 KDIO

Programming
- Format: Classic country

Ownership
- Owner: Prairie Winds Broadcasting, Inc.
- Sister stations: KJKQ, KMSD, KPHR

History
- First air date: 1977

Technical information
- Licensing authority: FCC
- Facility ID: 67770
- Class: D
- Power: 670 watts day 38 watts night
- Transmitter coordinates: 45°20′59″N 96°27′8″W
- Translator: 94.5 K233DL (Ortonville)

Links
- Public license information: Public file; LMS
- Webcast: Listen Live
- Website: KDIO website

KDIO (1350 AM) is a radio station broadcasting a Country music format. Licensed to Ortonville, Minnesota, United States, the station is currently owned by Prairie Winds Broadcasting.

== History ==
On June 22, 2007, the station was sold to Big Stone Broadcasting and on October 2, 2007, the station was sold to Armada Media .

Effective August 30, 2019, Armada Media sold KDIO, four sister stations, and a translator to Prairie Winds Broadcasting, Inc. for $1.5 million.
