= WCHT =

- Escanaba, Michigan; United States
- Broadcast area: Upper Peninsula
- Frequency: 600 kHz
- Branding: NewsTalk Radio 93.5 FM 600 AM

Programming
- Format: Conservative Talk
- Affiliations: Premiere Networks; Westwood One

Ownership
- Owner: AMC Partners, LLC

History
- First air date: 1958
- Former call signs: WLST (1958–1971); WBDN (1971–1986)
- Call sign meaning: "Classic hits" (former format)

Technical information
- Licensing authority: FCC
- Facility ID: 47119
- Class: D
- Power: 570 watts (day); 134 watts (night)
- Transmitter coordinates: 45°48′19″N 87°10′13″W
- Translator: 93.5 W228DQ (Escanaba)

Links
- Public license information: Public file; LMS
- Website: www.radioresultsnetwork.com/wcht

WCHT (600 AM) is a conservative talk radio station licensed to Escanaba, Michigan, with a power output of 570 watts during the day and 134 watts night, covering much of the central Upper Peninsula of Michigan. The station is owned by AMC Partners, LLC, doing business as the Radio Results Network and broadcasts from studios on Ludington Avenue in Downtown Escanaba. Its programming is also simulcast on FM translator W228DQ, licensed to Escanaba at 93.5 MHz, with an effective radiated power of 250 watts.

== Programming ==
Weekdays on WCHT begin with The Fox News Rundown from Fox News Radio followed by This Morning, America's First News with Gordon Deal. From 9 am to Noon, the station airs the Steve Gruber Show, a statewide conservative talk show originating from WJIM in Lansing, Michigan. On Wednesdays, the show is preempted for the local Shoreline Shopping Show program.

The rest of the day, nationally syndicated programs include The Clay Travis and Buck Sexton Show, The Sean Hannity Show, The Mark Levin Show, The Ramsey Show with Dave Ramsey, and Fox Sports Radio.

On weekends, WCHT air specialty shows on health, money, technology, the outdoors, farming and home repair. Weekend syndicated programs include The Kim Komando Show and Peter Greenberg's Eye on Travel, as well as repeats of weekday shows. The station also airs Outdoor Magazine with Mike Avery, a Michigan-based hunting and fishing talk show, and the Michigan-based travel show Behind the Mitten.

WCHT airs play-by-play sports coverage of the Detroit Pistons and Detroit Red Wings. Local high school sports and Northern Michigan University athletics are also heard on the station.

National and international news updates come from FOX News Radio and statewide news from the Michigan News Network. WCHT is also airs financial reports from CNBC and weather reports from television station WJMN-TV.

== History ==
WCHT first began broadcasting under the WLST call sign in 1958, and then became WBDN around 1971. WBDN programmed adult contemporary music throughout the 1970s and then went country around 1979, keeping that format until late 1986, when the station switched formats to oldies under the WCHT calls (with the call letters standing for classic hits). For a short period of time, WCHT's current news talk format was simulcast on the FM band on WMXG.
