= WGLQ =

Coordinates: 46.134°N 86.948°W

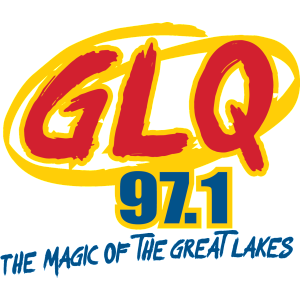
- Escanaba, Michigan; United States
- Broadcast area: Escanaba-Marquette
- Frequency: 97.1 MHz
- Branding: 97.1 GLQ

Programming
- Format: Hot Adult Contemporary
- Affiliations: Fox News Radio

Ownership
- Owner: AMC Partners, LLC; (AMC Partners Escanaba, LLC)
- Sister stations: WUPZ, WZNL, WJPD, WUPG, WCMM

History
- First air date: 1976
- Former call signs: WKZY (1976-4/16/82)
- Call sign meaning: Great Lakes

Technical information
- Facility ID: 47120
- Class: C0
- ERP: 100,000 watts
- HAAT: 326 meters (1,070 ft)

Links
- Webcast: Listen Live
- Website: WGLQ Radio

WGLQ (97.1 FM) is a Hot AC radio station licensed to Escanaba, Michigan, with a power output of 100,000 watts, covering the greater Central Upper Peninsula of Michigan. The station is owned by Armada Media Corporation, through licensee AMC Partners Escanaba, LLC, doing business as the Radio Results Network and broadcasts from studios on Ludington Street in Escanaba.

The station is branded as 97.1 WGLQ with a Hot Adult Contemporary format. The station may be better known as Magic 97, a moniker used for most of its existence as a Top 40 (CHR) station. WGLQ is the Packers Radio Network for Delta County and surrounding areas.

== Programming ==
WGLQ has a Hot Adult Contemporary format, playing music from the 1990s to current top 40 artists. It is branded as The Magic of the Great Lakes, a nod to the station's previous Contemporary Hit Radio format as Magic 97.

Personalities include TJ Ryan, Mindy Wills, Kent Bergstrom, and Tommy Kay. Nights and weekends consist syndicated music shows. Most hours begin with a Fox News Radio update, local news, and weather.

== Technical Details ==
The WGLQ transmitter is co-located on the WJMN-TV tower which is located 30 miles north of Escanaba (approximately 5 miles south of Trenary, Michigan) along U.S. Highway 41. The transmitter broadcasts an analog signal at 100,000 watts effective radiated power which gives the station approximately 110 radial miles of coverage. The station can typically be heard as far south as Marinette, Wisconsin, as far north as L'Anse, Michigan, and as far east as Newberry, Michigan.

The transmitter is located near the top of its mounting tower at 1,070 feet. The tower itself is built in a very geographically flat area; its height above average local terrain is the same.

The station holds a commercial class C0 license with the Federal Communications Commission that is valid until October 1, 2028.

== History ==
Previous logo

Alpine Broadcasting Company launched the station in 1976 as WKZY with a program format featuring beautiful music.

The station evolved into an adult contemporary format and used the on-air identifier "Z97" for a short time before moving back to the beautiful music format.

On April 26, 1982, the call-sign was changed to WGLQ and the format became contemporary hit radio (CHR). The station adopted a new slogan alongside its new format as The Rhythm of the Great Lakes. For almost a decade, the station was a "live-assist" station with TM Programming's Stereo Rock format. The station converted to fully local programming in the late 1980s. In the late 1990's, the station's slogan changed to Magic 97.

Lakes Radio, Inc. operated the station from 1994 through 2015, which is when WGLQ and four other stations were sold to Armada Media Corporation (AMC) Partners, LLC and added to their list of stations operated under the Radio Results Network operating group.
