= WCMM =

Coordinates: 45.967°N 86.488°W

- Gulliver, Michigan; United States
- Broadcast area: Escanaba, Michigan
- Frequency: 102.5 MHz
- Branding: 102.5 The Moose

Programming
- Format: Country

Ownership
- Owner: AMC Partners, LLC; (AMC Partners Escanaba, LLC)

History
- First air date: February 1, 1988
- Former call signs: WAPJ (1988); WTIQ-FM (1988-1992)
- Call sign meaning: Country Music Machine

Technical information
- Licensing authority: FCC
- Facility ID: 73995
- Class: C1
- ERP: 60,000 watts
- HAAT: 248 meters (813 feet)

Links
- Public license information: Public file; LMS
- Webcast: Listen Live
- Website: radioresultsnetwork.com

WCMM (102.5 FM) is a country music radio station that is licensed to the community of Gulliver, Michigan and serving the greater Manistique and Escanaba areas. The station is owned by Armada Media Corporation, through licensee AMC Partners Escanaba, LLC, doing business as the Radio Results Network and broadcasts from studios on Ludington Street in Escanaba.

The station is branded as Fresh Country - 102.5 The Moose and shares the same personalities and playlist as sister station WJPD in the Marquette area, however the two stations are not a pure simulcast, as they offer different commercial inventory.

WCMM is the Detroit Lions Radio Network for the east-central Upper Peninsula.
