= Escanaba, Michigan =

- City
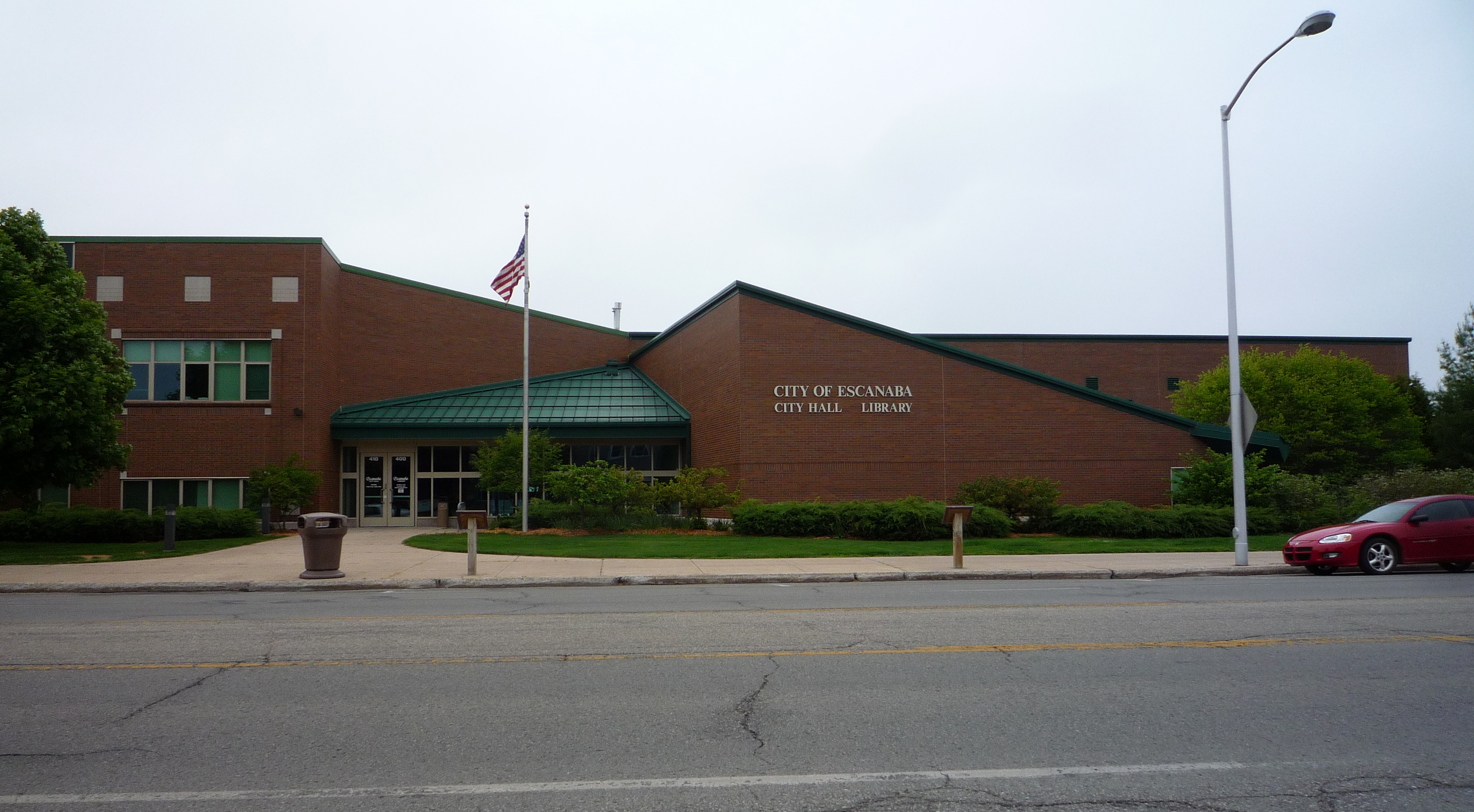
- Escanaba City Hall and Library
- Nickname: Esky
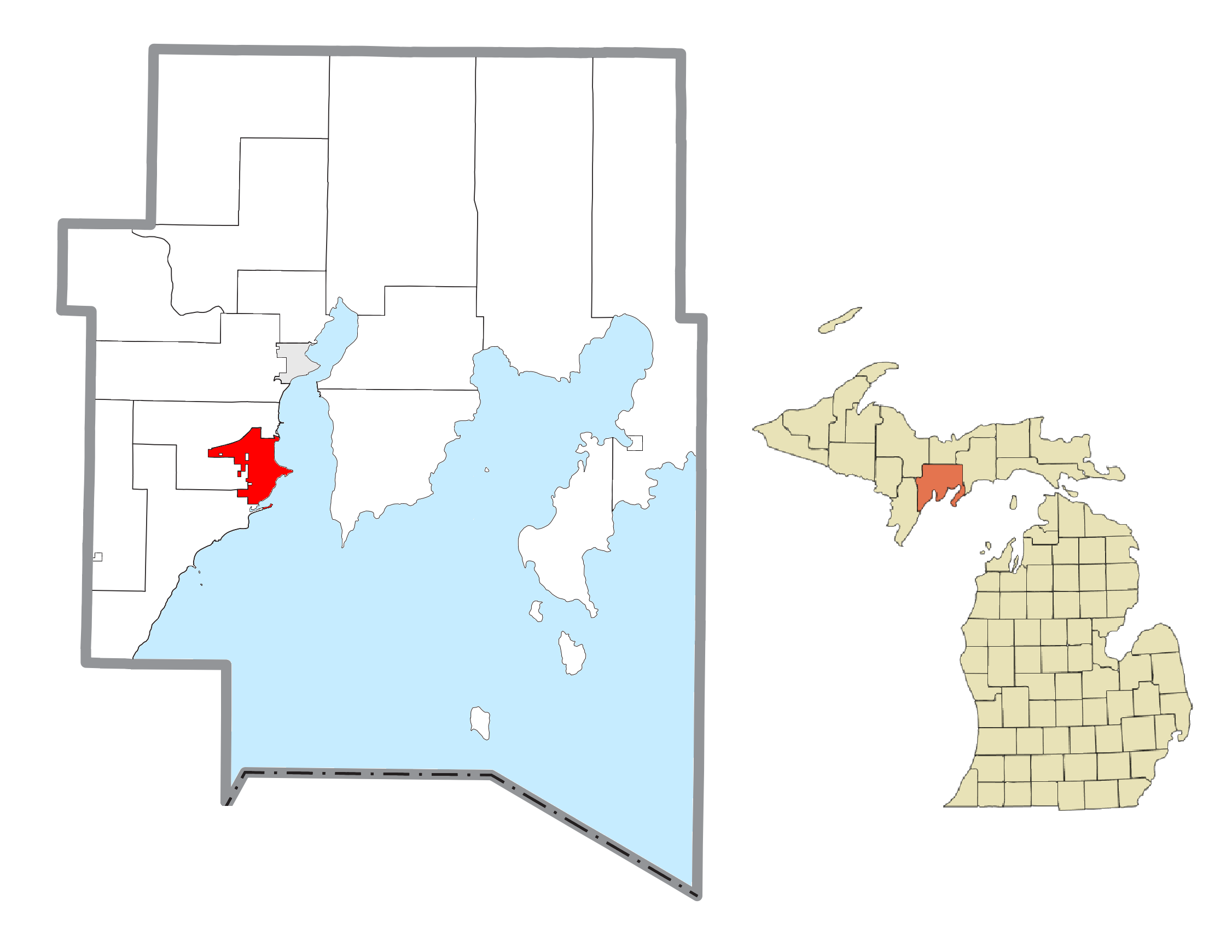
- Location within Delta County

- Location within the state of Michigan
- Coordinates: 45°44′45″N 87°03′51″W
- Country: United States
- State: Michigan
- County: Delta
- Incorporated: 1866 (village); 1883 (city)
- Founder: Eli Parsons Royce
- Named for: Ojibwe for "land of the red buck"

Government
  - Type: Council–manager
  - Mayor: Mark Ammel
  - City manager: James McNeil
  - City Council: Members: Karen Moore - Mayor Pro Tem; Ron Beauchamp; Todd Flath; Tyler DuBord

Area
  - Total: 16.37 sq mi (42.39 km^{2})
  - Land: 12.75 sq mi (33.01 km^{2})
  - Water: 3.62 sq mi (9.38 km^{2})
- Elevation: 607 ft (185 m)

Population (2020)
  - Total: 12,450
  - Density: 976.9/sq mi (377.17/km^{2})
- Time zone: UTC−5 (EST)
  - Summer (DST): UTC−4 (EDT)
- ZIP Codes: 49829, 49894
- Area code: 906
- FIPS code: 26-26360
- GNIS feature ID: 1619865
- Website: Official website

Escanaba (/ˌɛskəˈnɑːbə/ ES-kə-NAH-bə), commonly shortened to Esky, is a port city in and the county seat of Delta County in the U.S. state of Michigan, located on Little Bay de Noc in the state's Upper Peninsula. The population was 12,450 at the 2020 census, making it the third-largest city in the Upper Peninsula after Marquette and Sault Ste. Marie.

There is also Escanaba Township, which is north of the city and is not adjacent to it, although a portion of the urban area around the city extends into the township. Both are named for the Escanaba River, which flows into the Little Bay de Noc of Lake Michigan just north of the city. The names are derived from the Ojibwa language.

== History ==
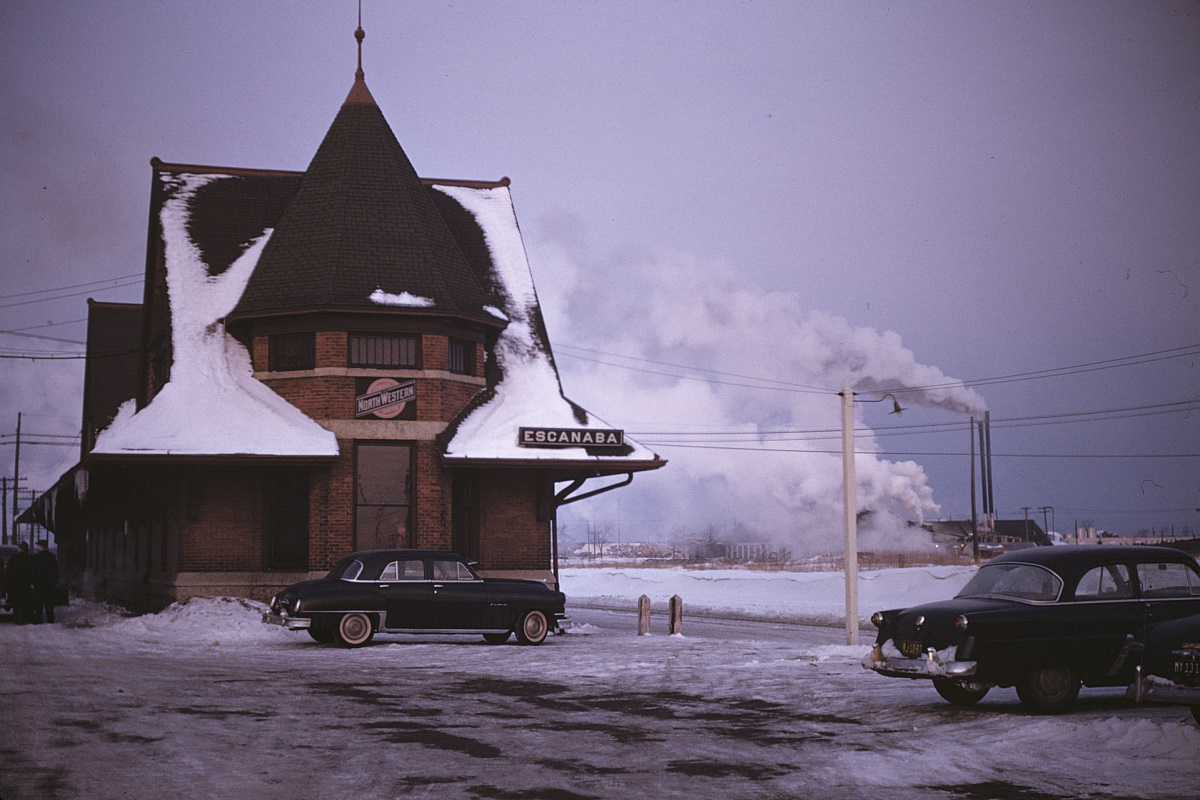
C&NW railway station in Escanaba, Michigan, 1953

Many native tribes have inhabited the area along Green Bay that is today Escanaba, including the Noquet, Potawatomi, Menominee and Ojibwe. "Escanaba" was the name of an Ojibwe village in this area in the early 19th century. The Ojibwa are one of the Anishinaabe, Algonquian-speaking tribes who settled and flourished around the Great Lakes. The word "Escanaba" roughly translates from Ojibwe and other regional Algonquian languages to "land of the red buck", although some people maintain that it refers to "flat rock".

As a European-American settlement, Escanaba was founded in 1863 as a port town by surveyor Eli P. Royce. Early industry was the processing and harvesting of lumber, dominated in this area by Daniel Wells Jr., Jefferson Sinclair, and Nelson Ludington. Ludington later moved his headquarters to Chicago, where he also entered banking. I. Stephenson established a successor lumber company in the area and also became a capitalist.

Before the war, iron ore was being mined from the Marquette Iron Range, which shipped out on barges from Escanaba. By the time of the American Civil War, this port was important to the Union as a shipping point for these ores, in addition to lumber. The Menominee Range and Gogebic Range of Michigan became important for iron ore after the war, in the 1880s. In 1994, Michigan produced about 25% of the iron ore nationally. Initially lumber was still integral to shipbuilding, and supported the construction of houses in cities throughout the developing Midwest. Iron ore supported industrialization, and became part of steel and other industries in the Midwest. As shipping increased, a lighthouse was needed to warn of a sand shoals in Little Bay de Noc, which extended from Sand Point, a sandspit located just south of and adjacent to the harbor area. The United States Lighthouse Service approved construction of the Sand Point Lighthouse at a cost of $11,000. Construction began in the fall of 1867 and was completed in early spring 1868.

=== Present day ===
Until 2017, Escanaba continued to be an important shipping point for iron ore to other Great Lakes ports, especially south to Chicago and northern Indiana. The local paper mill, for many years owned by Mead Corporation's Publishing Paper Division, was operated by the Verso Corporation until 2022 when it was sold to Billerud. Located on the outskirts of the city alongside the Escanaba River, in 2018 the mill was Escanaba's largest employer.

On May 20, 2017, hypermarket chain Meijer opened its first store in the Upper Peninsula in Escanaba; it had been under construction since 2016.

== Geography ==
According to the United States Census Bureau, the city has a total area of 16.50 sq mi (42.73 km^{2}), of which 12.88 sq mi (33.36 km^{2}) is land and 3.62 sq mi (9.38 km^{2}) is water.

=== Climate ===
This climatic region is classified as humid continental climate, abbreviated "Dfb", according to the Köppen-Geiger climate classification. It is typified by large seasonal temperature differences, with warm to hot (and often humid) summers and cold (sometimes severely cold) winters. Escanaba is described as being in the banana belt of Michigan's Upper Peninsula. While most of the peninsula is affected by significant lake-effect snow, Escanaba's winter climate is much milder due to its location on the windward Lake Michigan shoreline.

Winter weather displayed near Ludington Park in Escanaba

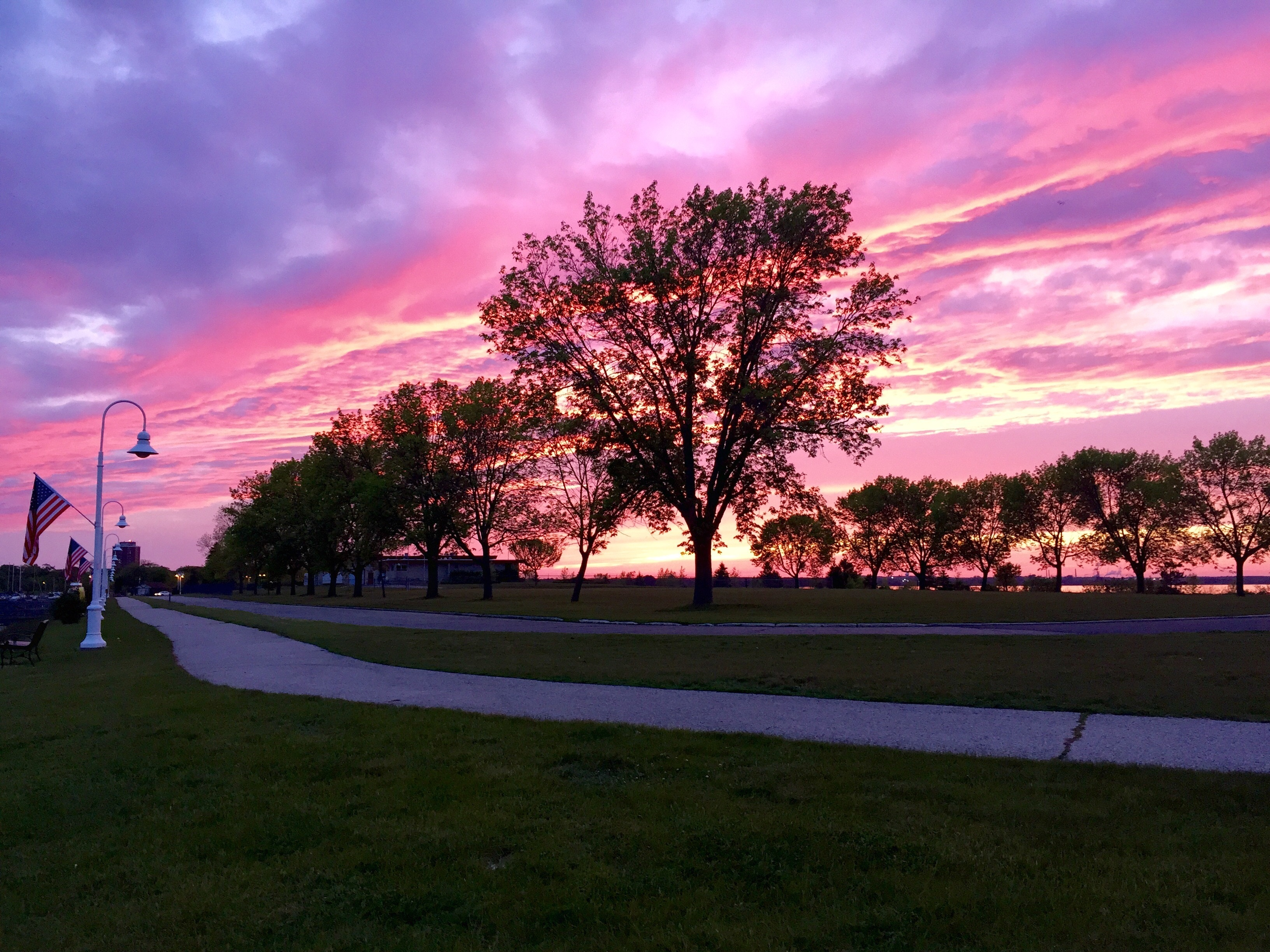
A sunset during the summer, as seen from Water Plant Road

Climate data for Escanaba, Michigan (1991–2020 normals, extremes 1948–present)
Month	Jan	Feb	Mar	Apr	May	Jun	Jul	Aug	Sep	Oct	Nov	Dec	Year
Record high °F (°C)	55 (13)	52 (11)	70 (21)	84 (29)	91 (33)	98 (37)	99 (37)	100 (38)	96 (36)	82 (28)	71 (22)	58 (14)	100 (38)
Mean daily maximum °F (°C)	25.6 (−3.6)	27.8 (−2.3)	36.7 (2.6)	47.3 (8.5)	60.3 (15.7)	70.5 (21.4)	76.6 (24.8)	75.6 (24.2)	67.6 (19.8)	54.5 (12.5)	42.2 (5.7)	31.1 (−0.5)	51.3 (10.7)
Daily mean °F (°C)	16.9 (−8.4)	18.0 (−7.8)	27.3 (−2.6)	38.4 (3.6)	50.4 (10.2)	60.7 (15.9)	66.5 (19.2)	65.4 (18.6)	58.2 (14.6)	45.5 (7.5)	34.8 (1.6)	23.8 (−4.6)	42.2 (5.7)
Mean daily minimum °F (°C)	8.1 (−13.3)	8.2 (−13.2)	17.9 (−7.8)	29.4 (−1.4)	40.6 (4.8)	50.9 (10.5)	56.4 (13.6)	55.2 (12.9)	48.9 (9.4)	36.5 (2.5)	27.4 (−2.6)	16.4 (−8.7)	33.0 (0.6)
Record low °F (°C)	−28 (−33)	−30 (−34)	−26 (−32)	−1 (−18)	23 (−5)	30 (−1)	38 (3)	38 (3)	25 (−4)	19 (−7)	−7 (−22)	−23 (−31)	−30 (−34)
Average precipitation inches (mm)	1.18 (30)	1.03 (26)	1.64 (42)	2.34 (59)	3.32 (84)	3.45 (88)	2.90 (74)	2.99 (76)	3.21 (82)	3.06 (78)	2.35 (60)	1.37 (35)	28.84 (733)
Average snowfall inches (cm)	13.7 (35)	10.2 (26)	6.1 (15)	4.4 (11)	0.0 (0.0)	0.0 (0.0)	0.0 (0.0)	0.0 (0.0)	0.0 (0.0)	0.0 (0.0)	2.3 (5.8)	10.2 (26)	46.9 (119)
Average precipitation days (≥ 0.01 in)	9.2	7.0	7.4	9.6	12.0	12.6	10.4	10.4	10.8	12.6	9.0	8.6	119.6
Average snowy days (≥ 0.1 in)	5.5	3.6	2.5	1.3	0.0	0.0	0.0	0.0	0.0	0.1	1.6	3.5	18.1
Source: NOAA

== Demographics ==
Historical population
Census	Pop.	Note	%±
1880	3,026		—
1890	6,808		125.0%
1900	9,549		40.3%
1910	13,194		38.2%
1920	13,103		−0.7%
1930	14,524		10.8%
1940	14,830		2.1%
1950	15,170		2.3%
1960	15,391		1.5%
1970	15,368		−0.1%
1980	14,355		−6.6%
1990	13,659		−4.8%
2000	13,140		−3.8%
2010	12,616		−4.0%
2020	12,450		−1.3%
U.S. Decennial Census

=== 2020 census ===
As of the 2020 census, Escanaba had a population of 12,450. The median age was 42.7 years. 20.5% of residents were under the age of 18 and 22.8% of residents were 65 years of age or older. For every 100 females, there were 91.1 males, and for every 100 females age 18 and over there were 88.3 males age 18 and over.

99.7% of residents lived in urban areas, while 0.3% lived in rural areas.

There were 5,721 households in Escanaba, of which 23.6% had children under the age of 18 living in them. Of all households, 33.9% were married-couple households, 22.7% were households with a male householder and no spouse or partner present, and 34.7% were households with a female householder and no spouse or partner present. About 41.0% of all households were made up of individuals, and 19.2% had someone living alone who was 65 years of age or older.

There were 6,341 housing units, of which 9.8% were vacant. The homeowner vacancy rate was 2.1% and the rental vacancy rate was 6.6%.

Racial composition as of the 2020 census
Race	Number	Percent
White	11,162	89.7%
Black or African American	71	0.6%
American Indian and Alaska Native	351	2.8%
Asian	93	0.7%
Native Hawaiian and Other Pacific Islander	2	0.0%
Some other race	52	0.4%
Two or more races	719	5.8%
Hispanic or Latino (of any race)	270	2.2%

=== 2010 census ===
As of the census of 2010, there were 12,616 people, 5,622 households, and 3,090 families residing in the city. The population density was 979.5/sq mi (378.2/km^{2}). There were 6,178 housing units at an average density of 479.7/sq mi (185.2/km^{2}). The racial makeup of the city was 93.5% White, 0.4% African American, 2.6% Native American, 0.6% Asian, 0.3% from other races, and 2.7% from two or more races. Hispanic or Latino of any race were 1.2% of the population.

There were 5,622 households, of which 26.1% had children under the age of 18 living with them, 36.8% were married couples living together, 13.6% had a female householder with no husband present, 4.6% had a male householder with no wife present, and 45.0% were non-families. Of all households 38.2% were made up of individuals, and 17.6% had someone living alone who was 65 years of age or older. The average household size was 2.14 and the average family size was 2.82.

The median age in the city was 41.4 years. 21.4% of residents were under the age of 18; 9.9% were between the ages of 18 and 24; 22.6% were from 25 to 44; 26.4% were from 45 to 64; and 19.6% were 65 years of age or older. The gender makeup of the city was 47.1% male and 52.9% female.

=== 2000 census ===
As of the census of 2000, there were 13,140 people, 5,800 households, and 3,294 families residing in the city. The population density was 1,038.3 inhabitants per square mile (400.9/km^{2}). There were 6,258 housing units at an average density of 494.5 per square mile (190.9/km^{2}). The racial makeup of the city was 95.66% White, 0.11% African American, 2.61% Native American, 0.33% Asian, 0.02% Pacific Islander, 0.18% from other races, and 1.09% from two or more races. Hispanic or Latino of any race were 0.66% of the population. 17.0% were of German, 16.5% French, 11.4% French Canadian, 8.8% Swedish, 6.4% Irish and 5.2% English ancestry, according to Census 2000.

There were 5,800 households, out of which 26.6% had children under the age of 18 living with them, 42.2% were married couples living together, 11.2% had a female householder with no husband present, and 43.2% were non-families. Of all households 37.0% were made up of individuals, and 18.1% had someone living alone who was 65 years of age or older. The average household size was 2.19 and the average family size was 2.88.

In the city, the population was spread out, with 22.5% under the age of 18, 9.8% from 18 to 24, 25.1% from 25 to 44, 21.2% from 45 to 64, and 21.4% who were 65 years of age or older. The median age was 40 years. For every 100 females, there were 87.7 males. For every 100 females age 18 and over, there were 82.3 males.

The median income for a household in the city was $29,125, and the median income for a family was $36,995. Males had a median income of $32,310 versus $21,204 for females. The per capita income for the city was $17,589. About 10.8% of families and 13.8% of the population were below the poverty line, including 17.7% of those under age 18 and 9.0% of those age 65 or over.

== Culture and contemporary life ==
Although the Upper Peninsula is part of the state of Michigan, Escanaba and the western Upper Peninsula sometimes have closer cultural ties to the state of Wisconsin.

=== Yooper culture ===
Pasties are a significant tourist attraction. Many ethnic groups adopted the pasty for use in the Copper Country copper mines; the Finnish immigrants within the region mistook it for the traditional piiraat and kuuko pastries. The pasty has become strongly associated with all cultures in this area.

=== Theater and performing arts ===
Escanaba is home to the William Bonifas Fine Arts Center, The Waterfront Art Festival, The Players de Noc, The Bay de Noc Choral Society, the Escanaba City Band, and many smaller arts organizations, art galleries, and musical performing groups.

== Parks and recreation ==
=== Parks ===
Harbor Hideout in Ludington Park

Sailboat departing the yacht harbor

Harbor Lighthouse at sunset

- Ludington Park: A three-quarter mile stretch of lake shore where the city's easternmost point extends into Little Bay de Noc, it is one of the largest city parks in Upper Michigan. Karas Band Shell is located on the south end of the park and it is where concerts are hosted during the summer. A veterans memorial is located in the center of the park. At the north end of the park (across from municipal marina) there is a scenic gazebo and fountain.
- Harbor Hideout: Located within Ludington Park, the 22,500 square foot playground is constructed of wood and features handicap accessible play areas.
  - Kiwanis Musical Playground: In June 2018, the Escanaba Kiwanis installed a new handicap accessible musical play area next to Harbor Hideout. The equipment that was installed included a metallophone, a set of chimes, a kettle drum, and a goblet drum. All of the new equipment installed is ADA-compliant.

=== Boating and beaches ===
- Escanaba Yacht Club: Established in 1934, it hosts several races and events for members during the summer.
- Escanaba Municipal Beach: located on Aronson Island, is open from early June to mid-August. The beach-house includes a changing facility with restrooms and showers. In addition, there is also a small playground and picnic area available for public use. The beach house usually has paddleboards and kayaks available for renting.
- Aronson Island Boat Launch: In order to use the boat launch a day-pass or seasonal permit is needed prior to launching a boat. The launch has a weight restriction of 6,000 pounds and a length restriction of 26 feet, if a boat exceeds this, a special permit must be obtained from the harbormaster.
- North Shore Boat Launch: located on the Escanaba River.

=== Places of interest ===
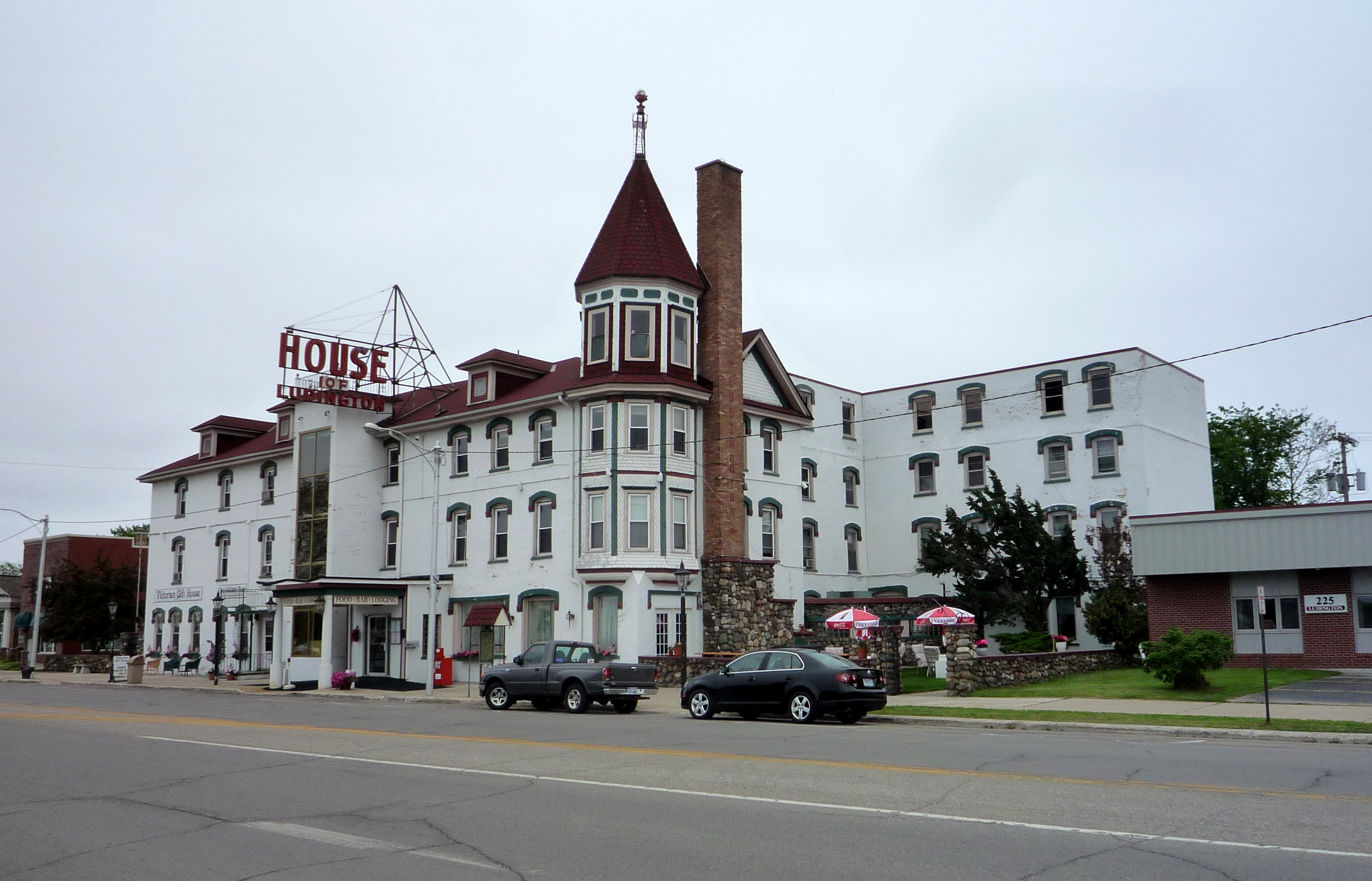
Historic House of Ludington

- The House of Ludington – A landmark historic hotel in downtown Escanaba. Originally built in 1865 as the Gaynor House Hotel, it was renamed in 1871 after prominent lumberman Nelson Ludington. It was rebuilt as a brick structure in the Queen Anne Style in 1883, becoming the New Ludington Hotel. It is believed that Al Capone utilized the tunnels located below the basement of the hotel during the prohibition era. On December 5, 2025, Escanaba Public Safety received a call regarding the smell of something burning. Officers found a storage room ablaze directly above the main entrance. It took first responders around six hours to extinguish the flames. The building was demolished on January 25, 2026, after 162 years.
- Sand Point Lighthouse & Delta County Historical Museum – Deactivated in 1939, this lighthouse was used by the United States Coast Guard to house seamen assigned to Escanaba. The building was completely restored to its original design in the late 1860s, and has been listed on the National Register of Historic Places, along with Escanaba's central downtown district.
- U.P. Steam & Gas Engine Museum
- Carnegie Public Library (Escanaba Public Library)
- Hiawatha National Forest
- Days River Pathway or Days River Nature Pathway
- Escanaba Farmer's Market
- UP North Lanes

== Laws and government ==
=== Government ===
Escanaba is located in US Congressional District 1 represented by Jack Bergman (R-2017). The city is in Michigan's 108th State House District and 38th State Senate District, represented by David Prestin (R-2023) and Ed McBroom (R-2019), respectively.

As the most populous area in Delta County, Escanaba's four precincts span three of Delta County's five Districts:

Delta County Commission Representatives
Delta County District	County Commissioner	Escanaba City Precinct
District 3	Christine Williams	Precinct 2
District 4	Kelli van Ginhoven	Precinct 1 Precinct 3
District 5	Matthew Jensen	Precinct 4

The Escanaba City Council consists of five council members who are elected to four-year terms. A Mayor, and a Mayor Pro-Tem are selected by the council members at the first regular meeting following the election.

=== Police and corrections ===
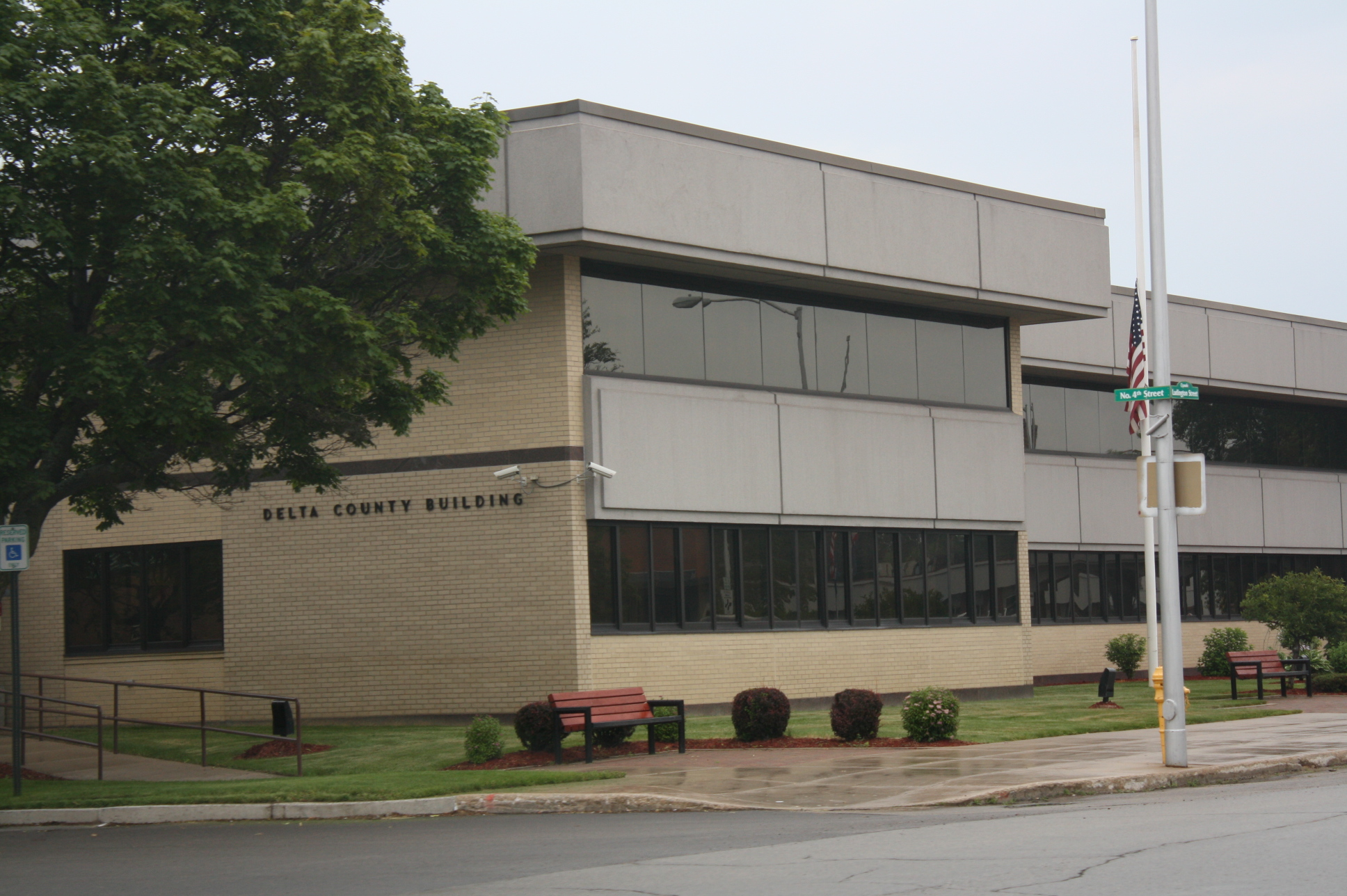
Delta County Courthouse

Escanaba established its own Department of Public Safety in 1975, which provides police and firefighting services to city residents.

Director of Public Safety: Darren Smith

Escanaba is also home to the Delta County Sheriff's Office, which employs ten deputies assigned to road and marine patrol. Additionally, the city is home to the newly constructed $17.9 million Correctional Facility with a capacity for 160 inmates.

Sheriff: Todd Tardiff

The Delta County Sheriff's Office participates in the Upper Peninsula Substance Enforcement Team (UPSET) as part of a multi-agency operation to arrest criminals engaged in the use, sale, and distribution of drugs throughout Michigan's Upper Peninsula.

=== Courts ===
The Delta County Courthouse serves all of Delta County. The courthouse includes the 47th Circuit Court, the 94th District Court, and Probate Court.

== Education ==
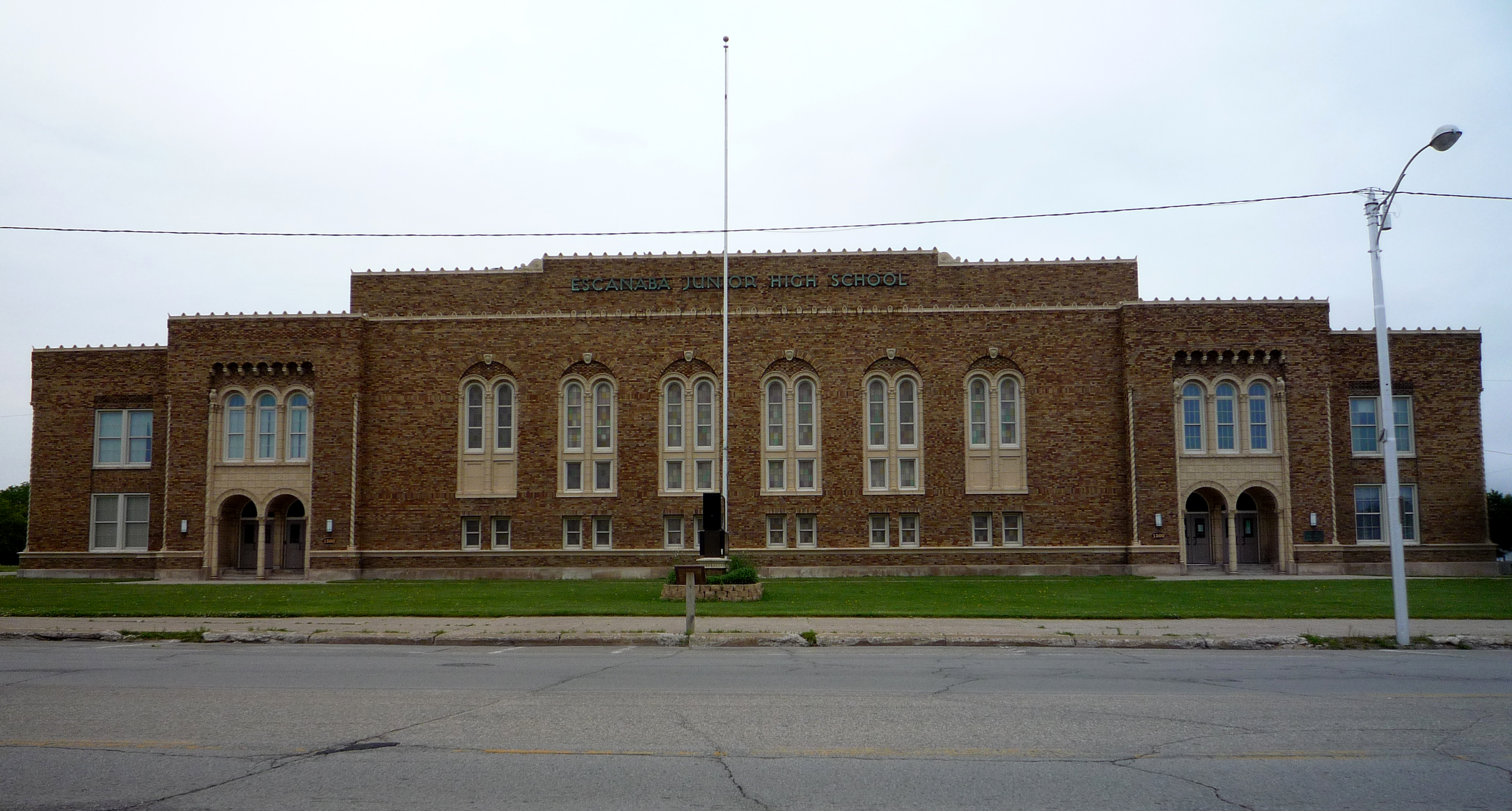
Escanaba Middle School

In 2003, the school board opted to completely renovate the historic 1930s junior high school, rather than move it outside of town. Escanaba Area Public Schools operate the public schools in Escanaba, which includes various elementary schools, the middle school, and the high school. There is also a private school, Holy Name Catholic School, which teaches pre-school to eighth grade. Bay College, a public 2-year college, was founded in the city in 1962. It offers various two year degrees and certificate programs ranging from welding, public safety, business, nursing, among others.

== Media ==
Local radio stations include KMB Broadcasting's WDBC 680 AM (adult standards) and WYKX 104.7 FM (country music), Lakes Radio's WCHT 600 AM (news/talk), WGLQ 97.1 FM (adult top 40), WCMM 102.5 FM (country), and WGKL 105.5 FM (oldies), and standalone WUPF 107.3 FM (classic hits). Escanaba is also served by low-power translator stations of WNMU translator W296AX from Marquette, Michigan (at 96.5 FM), WRPP translator W254AG from Sturgeon Bay, Wisconsin (at 98.7 FM), and WHWL translator W261AI from Marquette, Michigan (at 100.1 FM). WJMN-TV, the local MyNetworkTV television station on channel 3, formerly operated as a satellite of CBS affiliate WFRV in Green Bay. Radio and television signals originating from Door County, Wisconsin, across the bay are also generally easily received in the Escanaba area as well.

During the solar eclipse of January 24, 1925, Chicago radio station WJAZ, which had been broadcasting from a "motor truck" mounted portable transmitter, was transported to Escanaba, Michigan, to document the effects of the dimming sun on radio transmissions.

== Infrastructure ==
Escanaba's Harbor Tower, an 18-story apartment building, is the tallest building in Michigan's Upper Peninsula.

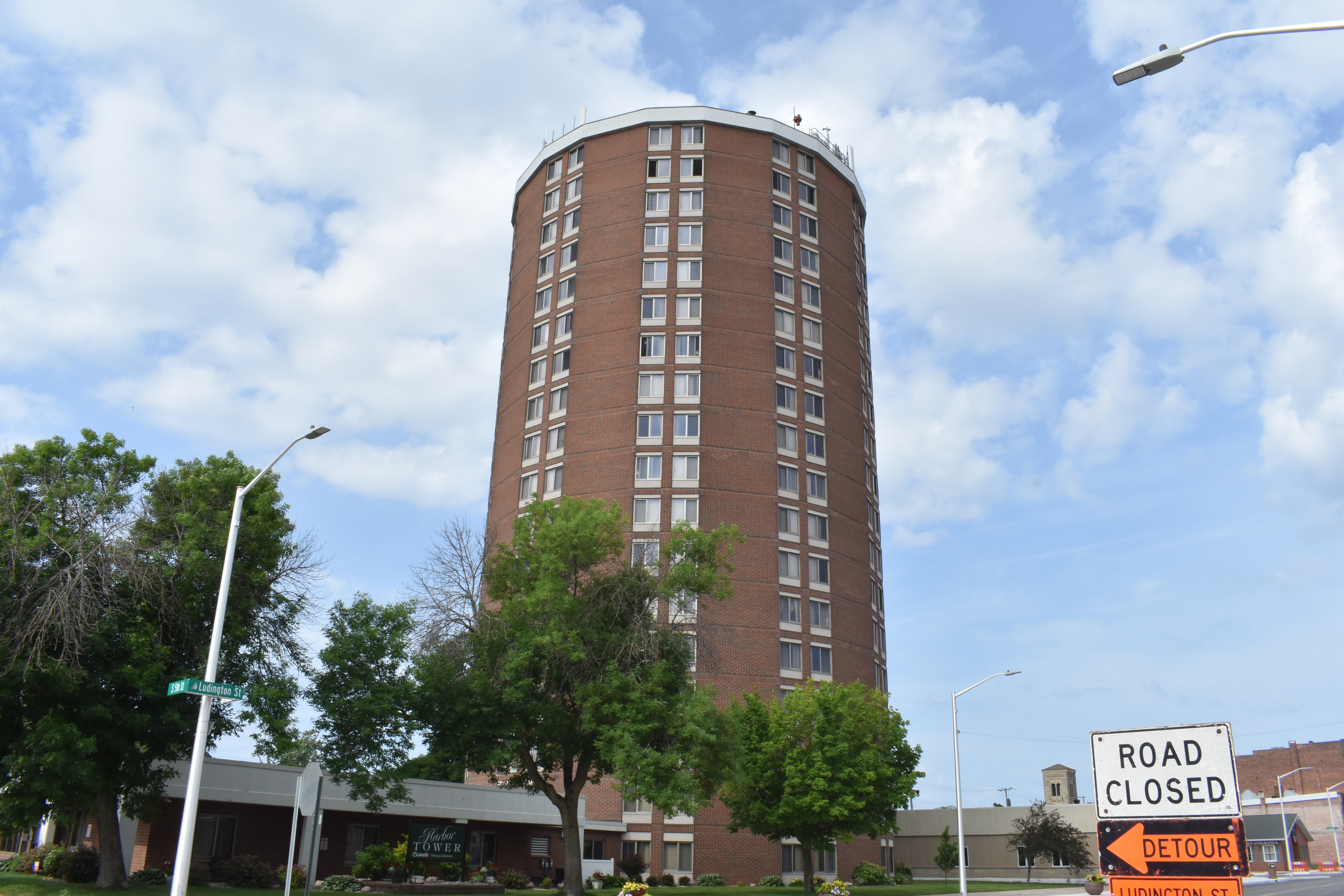
Harbor Tower, the Upper Peninsula's tallest building

=== Transportation ===
- US 2 runs eastward to St. Ignace and the Mackinac Bridge, 143 mi (230 km) to the east. Along the way it passes through Gladstone, 9 mi (14 km) north/east and Manistique, 54 mi (87 km) east. It runs west concurrent with US 41 until Powers, and from there 21 mi (34 km) west to Iron Mountain.
- US 41 connects with Marquette 66 mi (106 km) to the north and with Powers 24 mi (39 km) west before turning south to Menominee.
- M-35 runs northwest 51 mi (82 km) through undeveloped areas to Gwinn. Going south, it provides a direct route along the shore of Green Bay to Menominee, 55 mi (89 km) to the southwest.
- M-69 runs northwest toward many rural communities before ending at Crystal Falls.

=== Airport ===
- The city is served by Delta County Airport (KESC), with daily flights to Detroit and Minneapolis via Delta Connection.

=== Buses ===
- Indian Trails provides daily intercity bus service between St. Ignace and Ironwood, Michigan, and between Hancock, Michigan, and Milwaukee, Wisconsin

== Railroads ==
The Escanaba area has been serviced by several railroads. The former Chicago & Northwestern Railroad connected Green Bay to their main system around the same time that they built their mainline to Escanaba. The CMSP&P otherwise known as the Milwaukee Road connected Escanaba to their system shortly thereafter. In 1898, the Escanaba & Lake Superior owned by Issac Stephenson constructed a line from its connection to the Milwaukee Road. Both the C&NW and the CMSP&P ran passenger service to the Escanaba area as well. The C&NW also connected to the Duluth Missabe & Iron Range railroad in Escanaba. The C&NW would acquire the CMSP&P's trackage in Escanaba and Wells. With the creation of the Wisconsin Central railroad, most of the lines in Escanaba were unified in a single operation with the exception of the DMIR and the E&LS. In 2004, when CN controlled the WC, the DMIR sold to Canadian National. As of April 2021, just the E&LS and CN remain. CN owns the last two yards in Escanaba, being the Gladstone Yard, and the Escanaba Ore Docks.

== In popular culture ==
The 2001 comedy film Escanaba in da Moonlight is set in Escanaba. The film is known for prominently using Upper Peninsula language and slang.

Bluegrass musician and Michigan native Billy Strings published an instrumental named Escanaba on his 2024 album Highway Prayers.

== Notable people ==
- Tom Bissell, author and Guggenheim Fellow
- Kevin Chown, American bass player most notable for his work with Chad Smith of Red Hot Chili Peppers, and Tarja Turunen, Finnish soprano artist.
- Fahey Flynn, television news reader
- Karla M. Gray, Montana's first female chief justice
- Becky Iverson, professional golfer
- Nelson Ludington, settler who named the city
- Willard A. Saunders, Rear admiral, USN and Navy Cross recipient during World War II
- "Roaring Dan" Seavey, Great Lakes pirate
- Johnny Seymour, racing driver
- Kevin Tapani, baseball pitcher for thirteen Major League Baseball seasons
- Jack Tower, racing driver and riding mechanic
- Chauncey W. Yockey, Wisconsin State Assemblyman.

== Image gallery ==
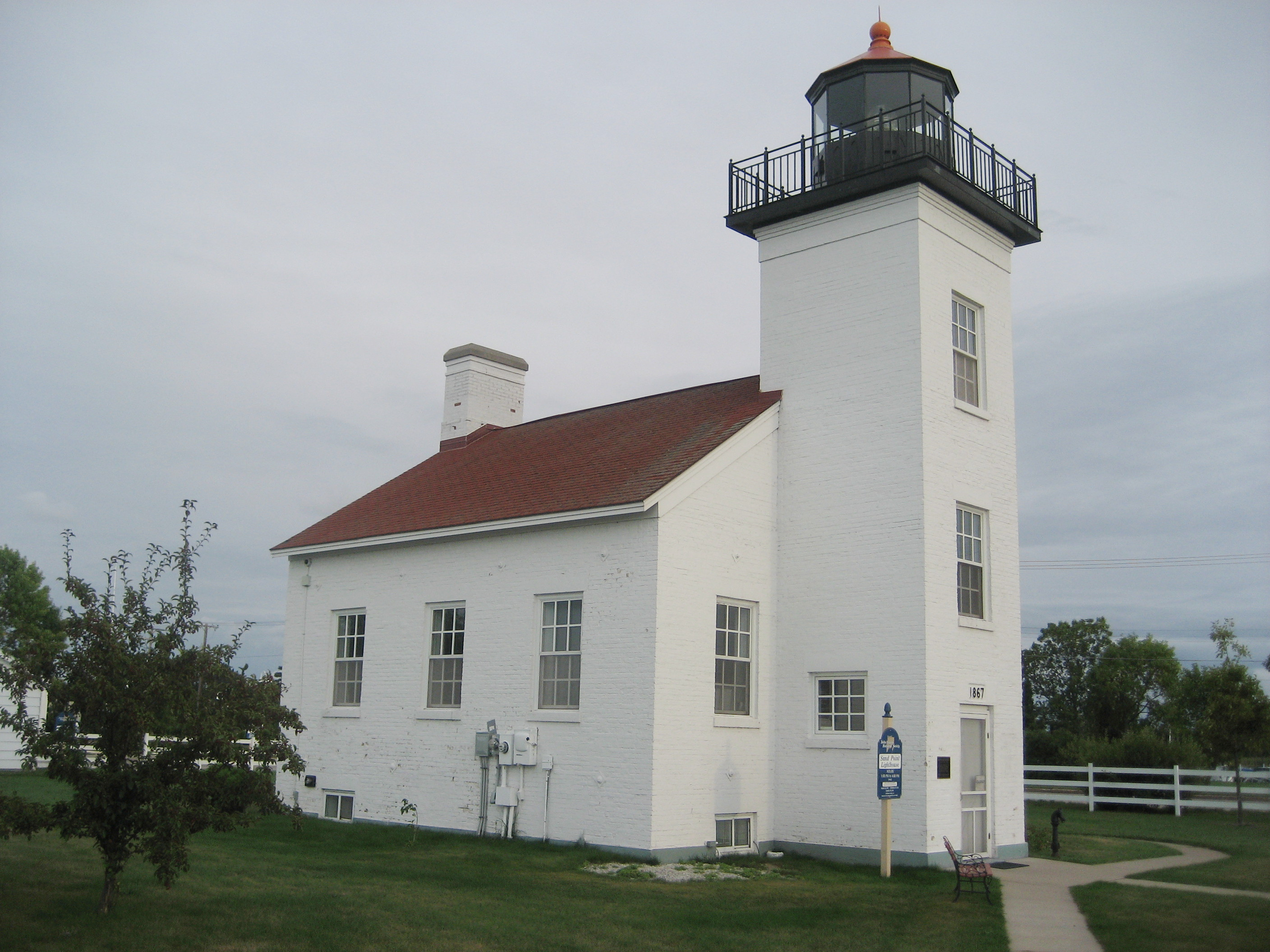
The Sand Point Lighthouse is on the National Register of Historic Places.

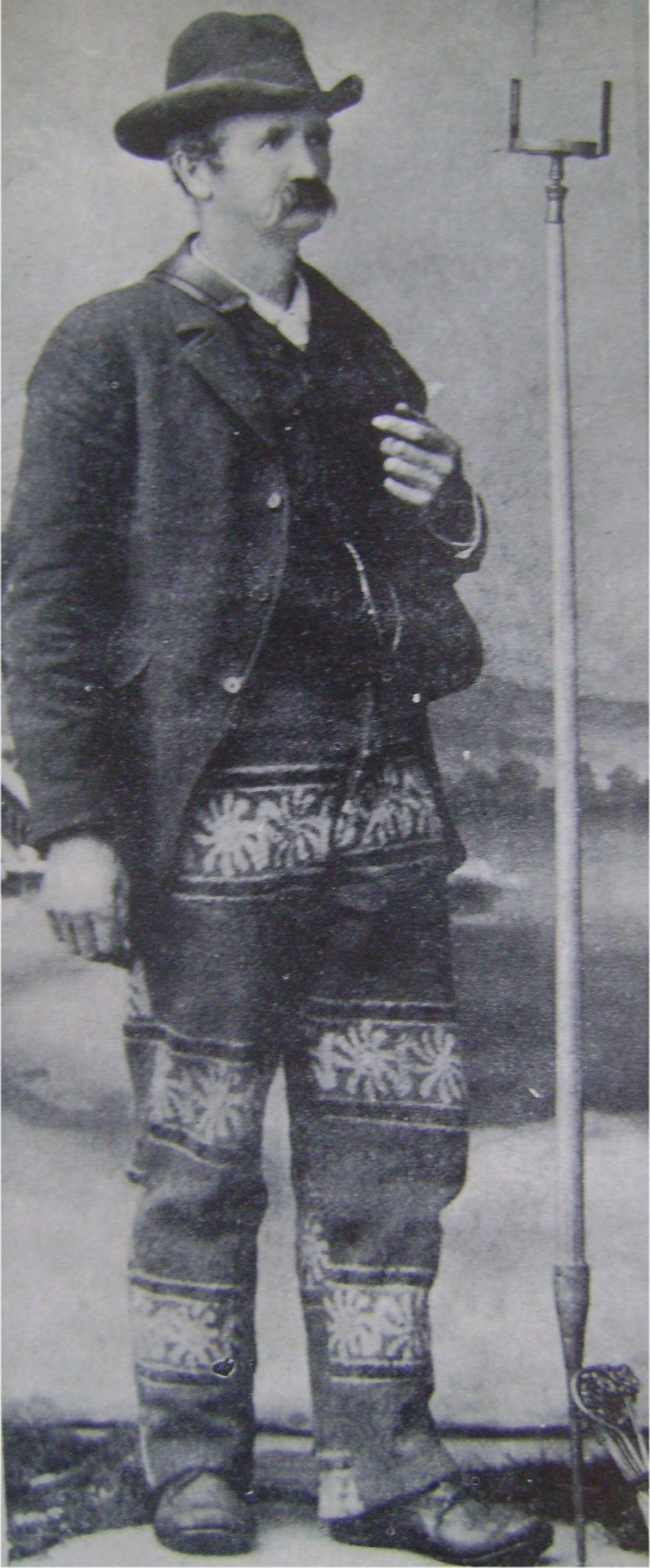
Surveyor Eli P. Royce founded the city of Escanaba.

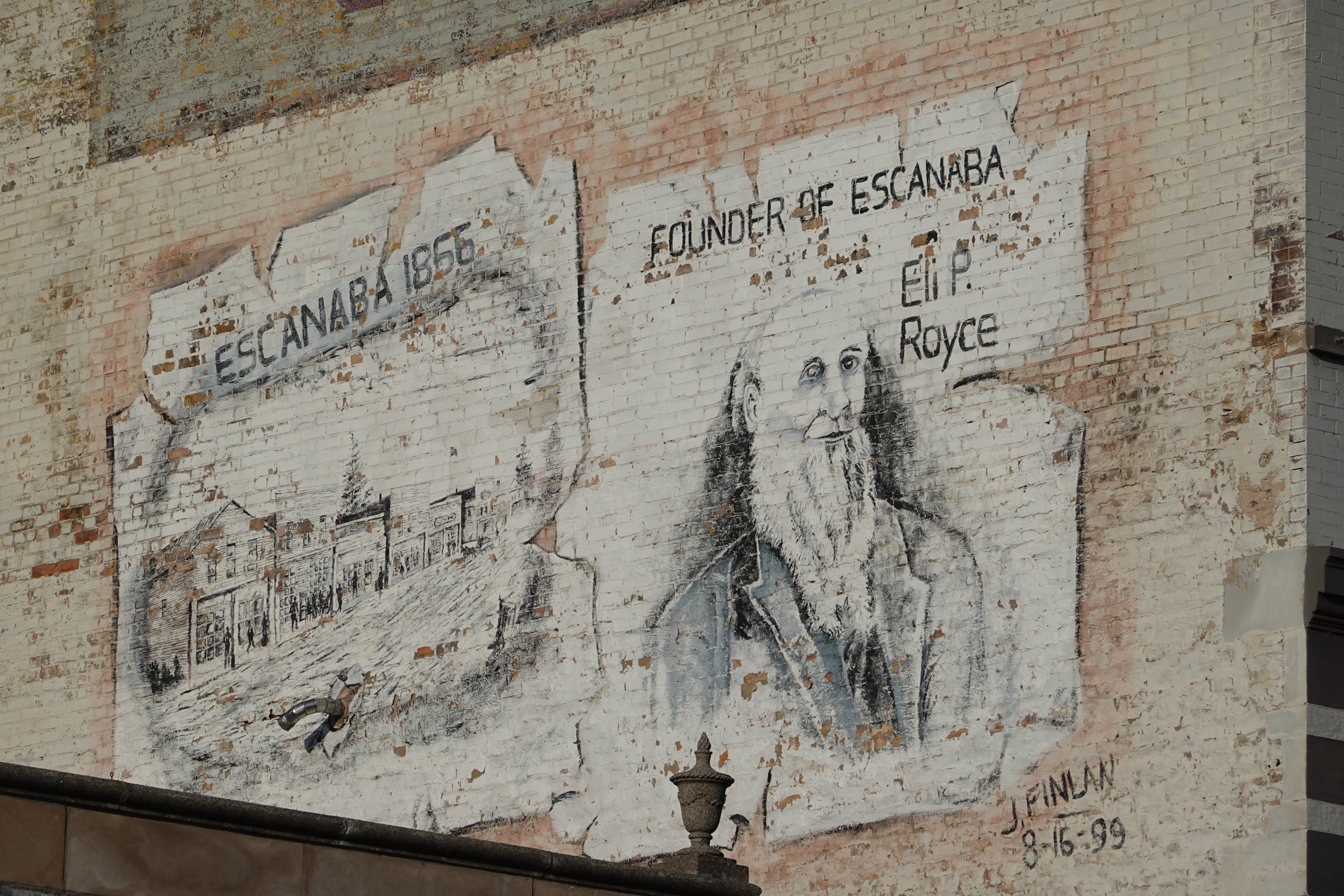
Founder Eli P. Royce honored on the side of a building in Escanaba, September 2021

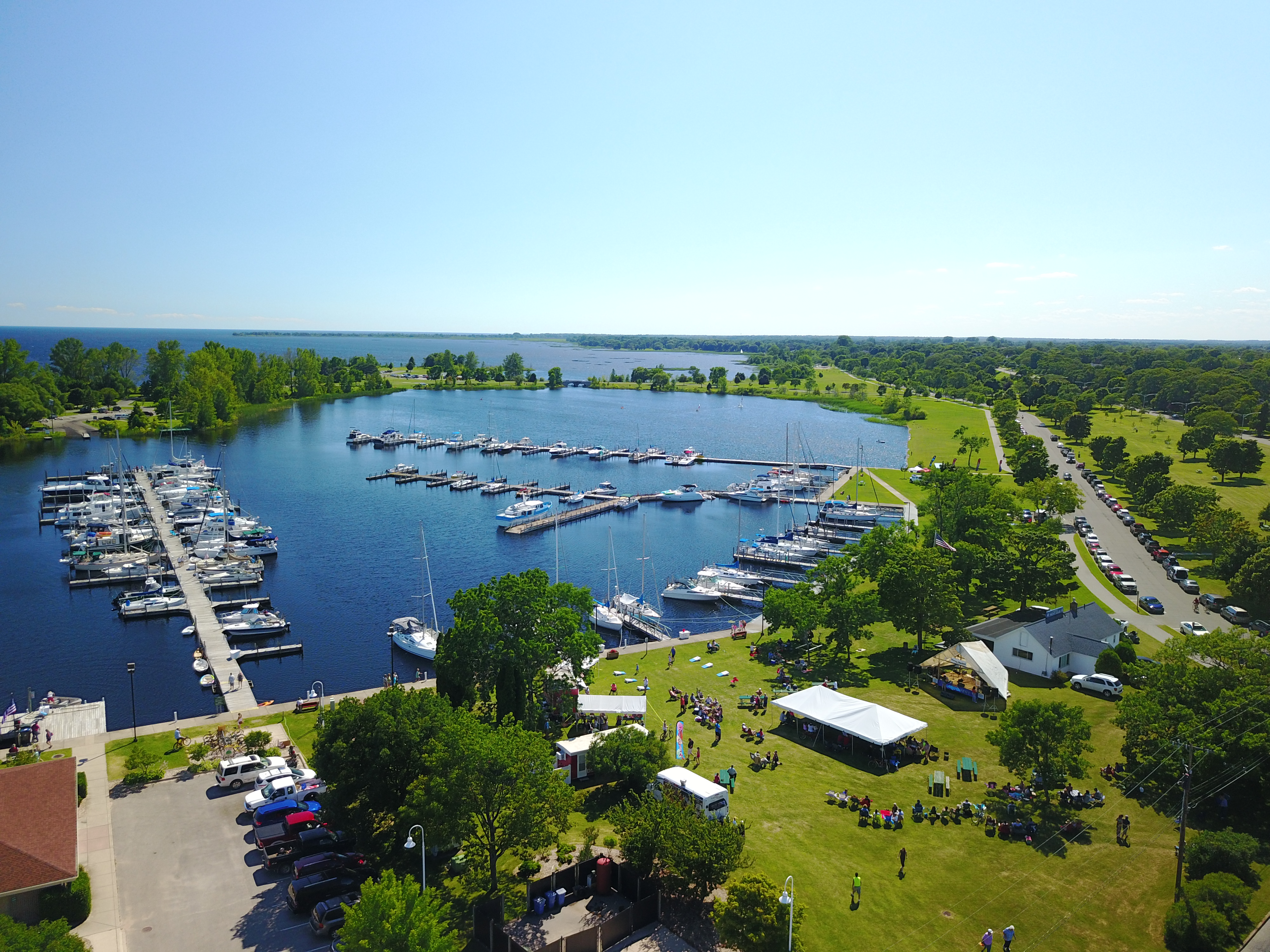
Aerial view of Escanaba's Ludington Park

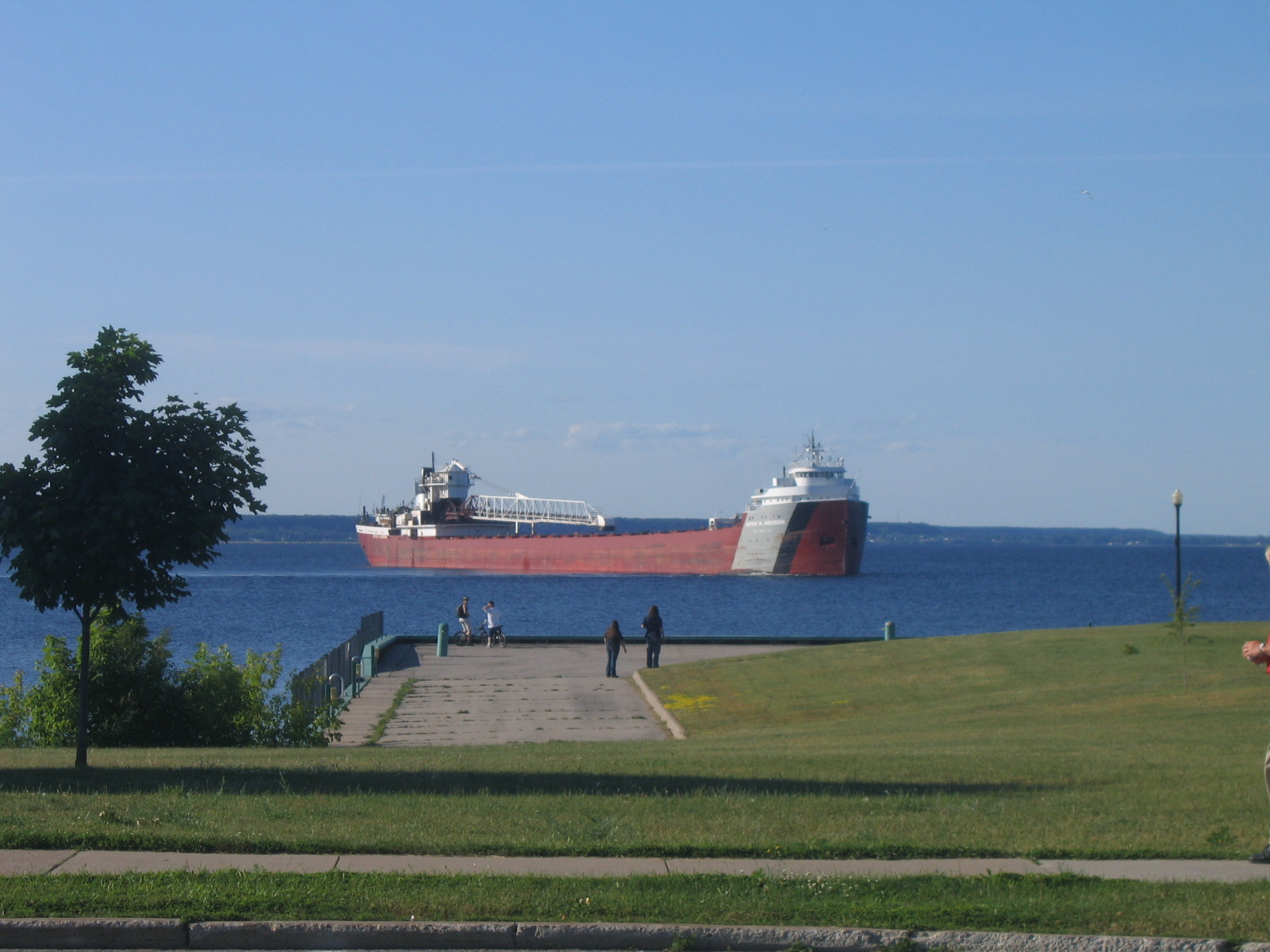
Ore freighter Arthur M. Anderson departing the Escanaba harbor
