= Randy Michaels =

American broadcasting executive

Benjamin Homel, known professionally as Randy Michaels, is an American broadcasting executive and a former member of the National Association of Broadcasters TV Board.

== Biography ==
Michaels has been involved in large market radio broadcasting since the early 1970s, first in front of the mike as evening personality at adult contemporary WGR in Buffalo. He later moved into management, and was CEO of Jacor Communications in the 1990s selling to Clear Channel in 1999 and remaining there as CEO until 2002. Early in 2005, Michaels began working with Oak Hill Capital partners on acquisition opportunities, culminating in the creation of Local TV LLC, a company that acquired nine local network-affiliated television stations formerly owned by The New York Times Company. In early 2007, Michaels became CEO of the company. On December 22, 2007, Local TV announced it was acquiring eight large market stations from Rupert Murdoch's News Corporation.

On December 20, 2007 Michaels became executive vice president (EVP) of the Chicago-based Tribune Company and chief executive officer (CEO) of Interactive and Broadcasting operations as part of the management restructuring following the consummation of the Tribune Company privatization transaction.

Under Michaels, Tribune Company was widely reported to have undergone a negative change in atmosphere, with instances of profanity from executives and strange memos being issued from management, as well as a controversial private poker party in Tribune Tower. The New York Times cited multiple witnesses who saw Michaels tell them to "watch this" before offering a waitress $100 to show her breasts at a Chicago hotel bar in 2008. The group he was with was "dumbfounded." On October 23, 2010, Michaels was asked to resign as Tribune's CEO by the board of directors, and was replaced temporarily by a four-member Executive Council, and later by Eddy Hartenstein, member of the interim council and publisher of the Los Angeles Times.

Michaels is also the sole proprietor of Radioactive, LLC, a holding company for radio broadcast licenses. Michaels also controls Merlin Media, LLC, which owned radio stations in New York City and Chicago.

On October 14, 2011, Michaels was arrested for operating a vehicle while intoxicated in Middletown, Ohio. Michaels pled guilty to a construction zone traffic charge.
