= Muskegon, Michigan =

- City
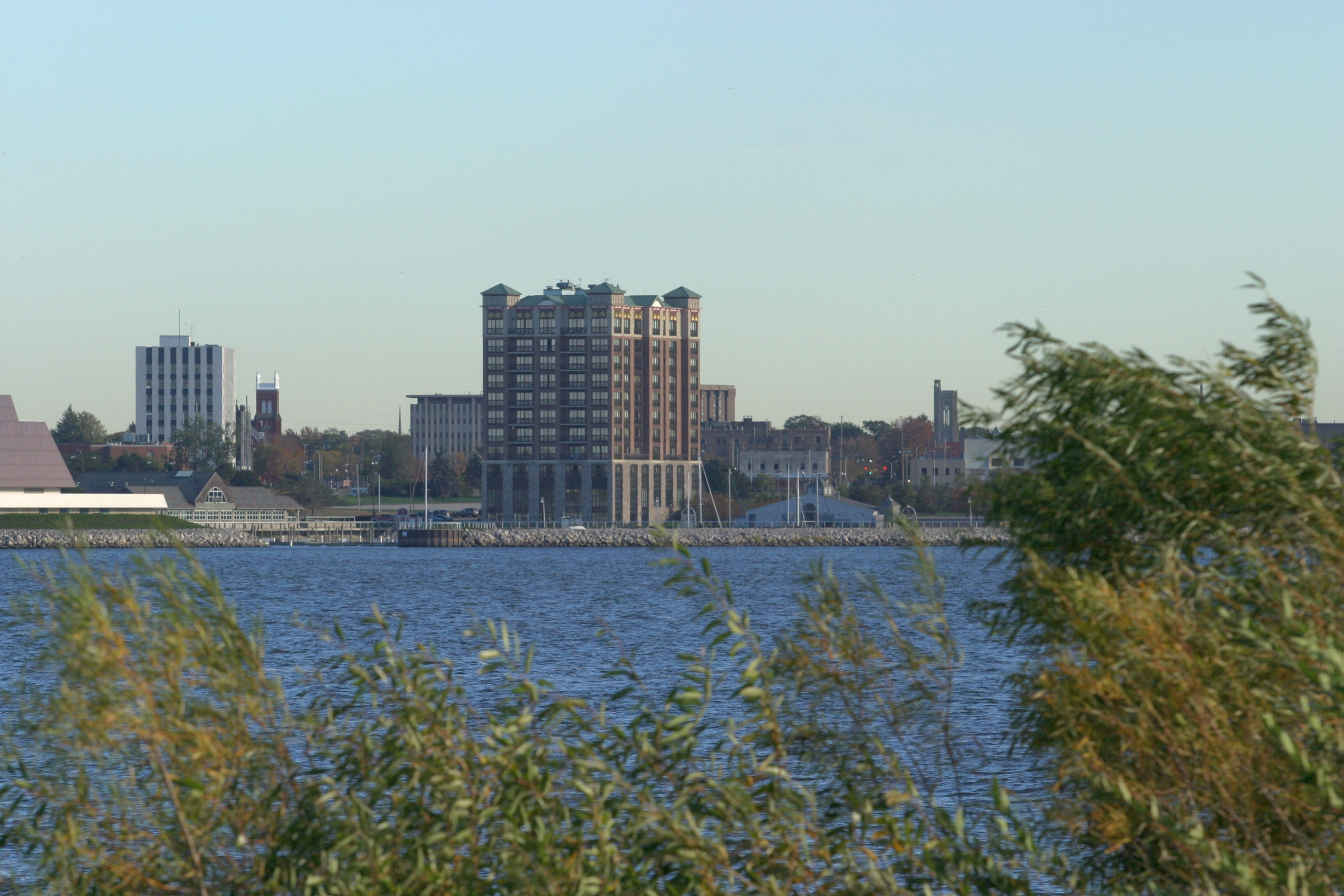
- Muskegon viewed from across Muskegon Lake

- Logo
- Nicknames: Port City, Lumber Queen of the World, Skeetown, Midwest Riviera, Lumbertown
- Interactive map of Muskegon, Michigan
- Location within Michigan Location within the United States
- Coordinates: 43°14′03″N 86°14′54″W
- Country: United States
- State: Michigan
- County: Muskegon

Government
  - Type: Commission-Manager
  - Mayor: Ken Johnson
  - City Manager: Jonathan Seyferth

Area
  - City: 18.20 sq mi (47.13 km^{2})
  - Land: 14.14 sq mi (36.63 km^{2})
  - Water: 4.05 sq mi (10.50 km^{2})
- Elevation: 628 ft (191.4 m)

Population (2020)
  - City: 38,318
  - Density: 2,709.3/sq mi (1,046.05/km^{2})
  - Metro: 175,824
- Time zone: UTC−5 (EST)
  - Summer (DST): UTC−4 (EDT)
- ZIP codes: 49440-49445
- Area code: 231
- FIPS code: 26-56320
- GNIS feature ID: 1620963
- Website: www.muskegon-mi.gov

Muskegon (/məˈskiːɡən/ mə-SKEE-gən) is a city in and the county seat of Muskegon County, Michigan, United States. Situated around a harbor of Lake Michigan, Muskegon is known for fishing, sailing regattas, and boating. It is the most populous city along Lake Michigan's eastern shore. At the 2020 census, the city's population was 38,318. The city is administratively autonomous from adjacent Muskegon Township, and several locations in Muskegon Township and other surrounding townships have Muskegon addresses.

Muskegon is the center of the Muskegon metropolitan statistical area, which is coextensive with Muskegon County and had a population of 175,824 as of the 2020 census. It is also part of the larger Grand Rapids-Kentwood-Muskegon-combined statistical area.

== History ==
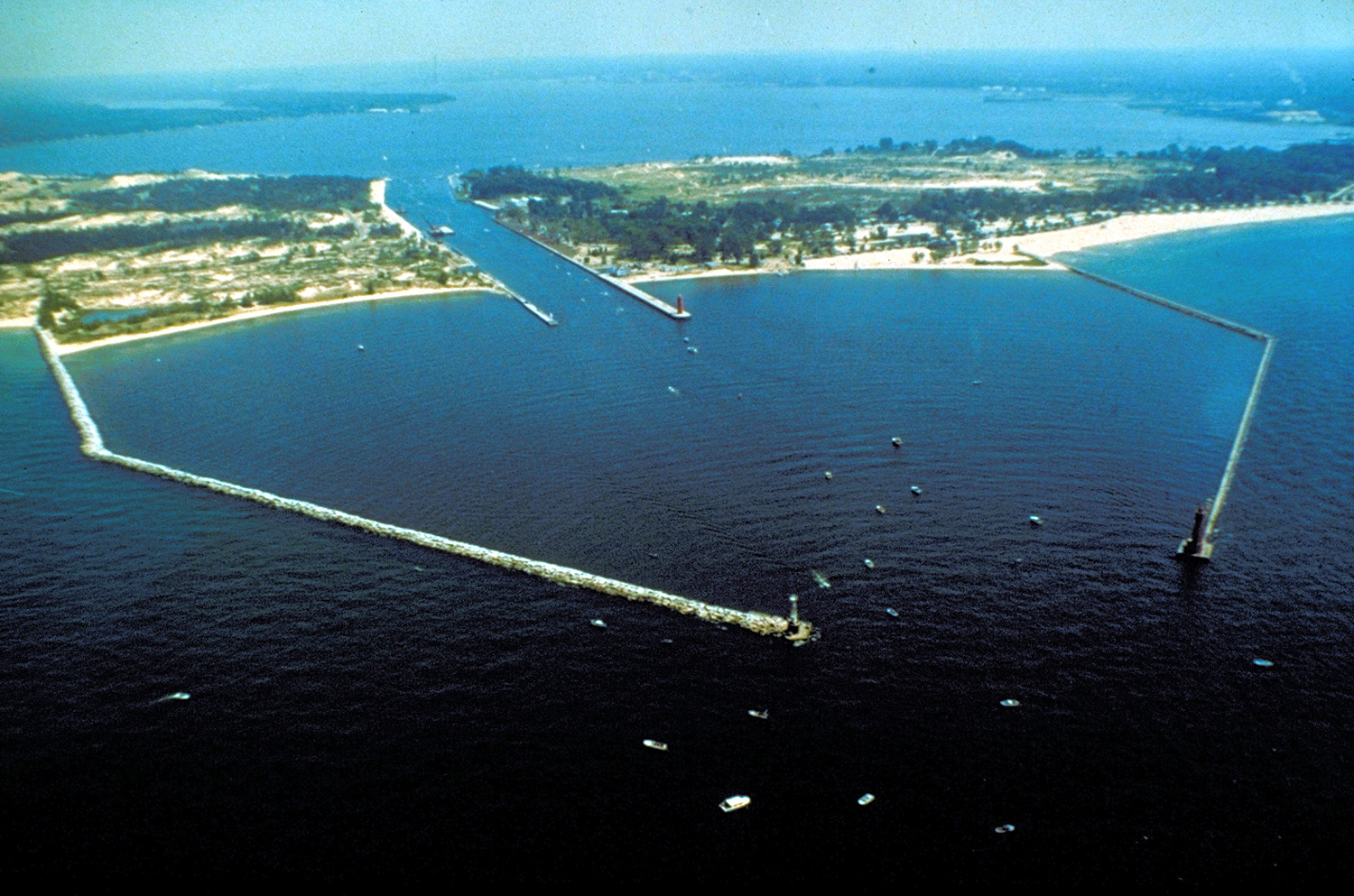
The entrance to Muskegon Lake from Lake Michigan

The name "Muskegon" is derived from the Ottawa mashkiigong, meaning "marshy river or swamp".

The "Masquigon" River (Muskegon River) was identified on French maps dating from the late 17th century, suggesting French explorers had reached Michigan's western coast by that time. Father Jacques Marquette traveled northward through the area on his fateful trip to St. Ignace in 1675, and a party of French soldiers under La Salle's lieutenant, Henry de Tonty, passed through the area in 1679.

The county's earliest known Euro-American resident was Edward Fitzgerald, a fur trader and trapper who came to the Muskegon area in 1748 and who died there, reportedly being buried in the vicinity of White Lake. Between 1790 and 1800, a French-Canadian trader named Joseph La Framboise established a fur-trading post at the mouth of Duck Lake. Between 1810 and 1820, several French-Canadian fur traders, including Lamar Andie, Jean Baptiste Recollect, and Pierre Constant, had established fur-trading posts around Muskegon Lake.

Euro-American settlement of Muskegon began in earnest in 1837, which coincided with the beginning of the exploitation of the area's extensive timber resources. The explosion of the lumber industry in 1837 inaugurated what some regard as the most romantic era in the history of the region. Lumbering in the mid-19th century brought many settlers, particularly from Germany, Netherlands, and Sweden.

Some Muskegon neighborhoods began as separate villages. Bluffton was founded as a lumbering village in 1862 in Laketon Township. It had its own post office from 1868 until 1892. Muskegon annexed it in 1889.

== Geography ==
Muskegon is in western Muskegon County, on the south side of Muskegon Lake, a harbor of Lake Michigan. The city is bordered to the north, across Muskegon Lake, by the city of North Muskegon and Laketon Township. It is bordered to the east by Muskegon Township, to the southeast by Fruitport Township, to the south by the cities of Muskegon Heights, Roosevelt Park, and Norton Shores, and to the west by Lake Michigan. It is 42 miles (68 km) northwest of Grand Rapids, 36 miles (58 km) north of Holland, and 58 miles (93 km) south of Ludington.

According to the U.S. Census Bureau, the city has an area of 18.20 square miles (47.14 km^{2}), of which 4.05 square miles (10.49 km^{2}), or 22.3%, are covered by water. The Muskegon River empties into Muskegon Lake at the city's northeast end.

In May 2022, local environmental groups announced cleanup efforts along Muskegon Lake officially have been completed, leading the Environmental Protection Agency to begin its study to remove Muskegon Lake from the EPA's list of "Areas of Concern", which was expected to be finalized by the end of 2022 and promised additional new economic activity in the downtown and nearby lakefront neighborhoods.

=== Climate ===
Muskegon has a humid continental climate (Dfa) with hot summers and cold winters. Precipitation is consistent year-round. Muskegon receives heavy lake-effect snow from Lake Michigan during winter.

Climate data for Muskegon, Michigan (Muskegon County Airport) 1991–2020 normals, (Note: Mean monthly maxima and minima (i.e. the highest and lowest temperature readings during an entire month or year) calculated based on data at said location from 1991 to 2020.) extremes 1896–present
Month	Jan	Feb	Mar	Apr	May	Jun	Jul	Aug	Sep	Oct	Nov	Dec	Year
Record high °F (°C)	63 (17)	67 (19)	82 (28)	86 (30)	96 (36)	98 (37)	99 (37)	99 (37)	95 (35)	86 (30)	76 (24)	66 (19)	99 (37)
Mean maximum °F (°C)	50.3 (10.2)	51.1 (10.6)	65.6 (18.7)	76.0 (24.4)	83.6 (28.7)	89.1 (31.7)	89.8 (32.1)	88.4 (31.3)	85.8 (29.9)	76.4 (24.7)	63.4 (17.4)	53.3 (11.8)	91.6 (33.1)
Mean daily maximum °F (°C)	32.5 (0.3)	34.5 (1.4)	44.3 (6.8)	56.6 (13.7)	68.4 (20.2)	77.7 (25.4)	81.6 (27.6)	80.2 (26.8)	73.4 (23.0)	60.6 (15.9)	47.8 (8.8)	37.4 (3.0)	57.9 (14.4)
Daily mean °F (°C)	26.6 (−3.0)	27.7 (−2.4)	35.7 (2.1)	46.8 (8.2)	57.9 (14.4)	67.4 (19.7)	71.9 (22.2)	70.8 (21.6)	63.5 (17.5)	51.9 (11.1)	41.0 (5.0)	31.9 (−0.1)	49.4 (9.7)
Mean daily minimum °F (°C)	20.7 (−6.3)	20.8 (−6.2)	27.1 (−2.7)	36.9 (2.7)	47.5 (8.6)	57.2 (14.0)	62.2 (16.8)	61.3 (16.3)	53.5 (11.9)	43.2 (6.2)	34.1 (1.2)	26.3 (−3.2)	40.9 (4.9)
Mean minimum °F (°C)	0.7 (−17.4)	2.4 (−16.4)	8.3 (−13.2)	21.8 (−5.7)	32.2 (0.1)	42.5 (5.8)	49.3 (9.6)	48.6 (9.2)	38.3 (3.5)	28.3 (−2.1)	20.7 (−6.3)	10.0 (−12.2)	−2.7 (−19.3)
Record low °F (°C)	−21 (−29)	−30 (−34)	−11 (−24)	1 (−17)	22 (−6)	31 (−1)	39 (4)	36 (2)	27 (−3)	19 (−7)	−14 (−26)	−15 (−26)	−30 (−34)
Average precipitation inches (mm)	2.42 (61)	2.11 (54)	2.40 (61)	3.47 (88)	3.38 (86)	3.05 (77)	2.75 (70)	3.10 (79)	3.26 (83)	3.80 (97)	2.92 (74)	2.42 (61)	35.08 (891)
Average snowfall inches (cm)	29.1 (74)	20.0 (51)	7.5 (19)	1.8 (4.6)	0.0 (0.0)	0.0 (0.0)	0.0 (0.0)	0.0 (0.0)	0.0 (0.0)	0.0 (0.0)	6.5 (17)	22.3 (57)	87.2 (221)
Average precipitation days (≥ 0.01 in)	16.3	12.9	10.9	12.5	11.3	10.0	9.1	9.1	9.4	12.6	13.5	14.9	142.5
Average snowy days (≥ 0.1 in)	14.4	11.7	5.4	1.4	0.0	0.0	0.0	0.0	0.0	0.2	4.1	10.9	48.1
Average relative humidity (%)	78.1	75.2	71.1	65.4	64.1	68.2	70.6	74.5	76.4	74.3	74.9	78.6	72.6
Average dew point °F (°C)	17.1 (−8.3)	17.4 (−8.1)	24.4 (−4.2)	33.1 (0.6)	43.0 (6.1)	53.6 (12.0)	59.5 (15.3)	59.7 (15.4)	53.2 (11.8)	42.3 (5.7)	31.8 (−0.1)	22.3 (−5.4)	38.1 (3.4)
Source 1: NOAA (relative humidity and dew point 1961–1990)
Source 2: World Meteorological Organization

== Demographics ==
Historical population
Census	Pop.	Note	%±
1860	1,450		—
1870	6,002		313.9%
1880	11,262		87.6%
1890	22,702		101.6%
1900	20,818		−8.3%
1910	24,062		15.6%
1920	36,570		52.0%
1930	41,390		13.2%
1940	47,697		15.2%
1950	48,429		1.5%
1960	46,485		−4.0%
1970	44,631		−4.0%
1980	40,823		−8.5%
1990	40,283		−1.3%
2000	40,105		−0.4%
2010	38,401		−4.2%
2020	38,318		−0.2%
U.S. Decennial Census

=== 2020 census ===
As of the 2020 census, Muskegon had a population of 38,318. The median age was 38.0 years. 21.2% of residents were under the age of 18 and 15.3% of residents were 65 years of age or older. For every 100 females there were 109.9 males, and for every 100 females age 18 and over there were 112.6 males age 18 and over.

100.0% of residents lived in urban areas, while 0.0% lived in rural areas.

There were 14,616 households in Muskegon, of which 27.1% had children under the age of 18 living in them. Of all households, 25.4% were married-couple households, 24.6% were households with a male householder and no spouse or partner present, and 40.6% were households with a female householder and no spouse or partner present. About 39.5% of all households were made up of individuals and 15.3% had someone living alone who was 65 years of age or older.

There were 16,184 housing units, of which 9.7% were vacant. The homeowner vacancy rate was 2.3% and the rental vacancy rate was 7.2%.

Racial composition as of the 2020 census
Race	Number	Percent
White	20,208	52.7%
Black or African American	13,101	34.2%
American Indian and Alaska Native	390	1.0%
Asian	148	0.4%
Native Hawaiian and Other Pacific Islander	10	0.0%
Some other race	1,570	4.1%
Two or more races	2,891	7.5%
Hispanic or Latino (of any race)	3,535	9.2%

=== 2010 census ===
As of the census of 2010, 38,401 people, 13,967 households, and 7,895 families resided in the city. The population density was 2,702.4 inhabitants per square mile (1,043.4/km^{2}). The 16,105 housing units had an average density of 1,133.4 per square mile (437.6/km^{2}). The racial makeup of the city was 57.0% White, 34.5% African American, 0.9% Native American, 0.4% Asian, 2.6% from other races, and 4.5% from two or more races. Hispanics or Latinos of any race were 8.2% of the population.

Of the 13,967 households, 32.5% had children under 18 living with them, 27.9% were married couples living together, 22.9% had a female householder with no husband present, 5.8% had a male householder with no wife present, and 43.5% were not families. About 36.0% of all households were made up of individuals, and 12.8% had someone living alone who was 65 or older. The average household size was 2.38. and the average family size was 3.09.

The median age in the city was 34.1 years; the age distribution was 23.3% were under 18; 12.2% from 18 and 24; 28.8% from 25 to 44; 24.1% from 45 to 64, and 11.6% were 65 or older. The city's gender makeup was 52.1% male and 47.9% female.

=== 2000 census ===
As of the census of 2000, 40,105 people, 14,569 households, and 8,537 families were residing in the city. The population density was 2,794.5 inhabitants per square mile (1,079.0/km^{2}). The 15,999 housing units had an average density of 1,114.8/sq mi (430.4/km^{2}). The racial makeup of the city was 57.9% White, 31.7% African American, 2.3% Native American, 0.46% Asian, 2.7% from other races, and 3.50% from two or more races. Hispanic or Latino people of any origins were 6.4% of the population.

Of the 14,569 households, 31.1% had children under 18 living with them, 33.2% were married couples living together, 20.2% had a female householder with no husband present, and 41.4% were not families. About 34.4% of all households were made up of individuals, and 12.9% had someone living alone who was 65 or older. The average household size was 2.42, and the average family size was 3.13.

In the city, the age distribution was 25.8% under 18, 11.6% from 18 to 24, 32.2% from 25 to 44, 18.0% from 45 to 64, and 12.4% who were 65 age or older. The median age was 32 years. For every 100 females, there were 109.6 males. For every 100 females 18 and over, there were 110.3 males.

The city's median income for a household was $27,929, and for a family was $32,640. Males had a median income of $29,114 versus $22,197 for females. The per capita income for the city was $14,283. About 16.8% of families and 20.5% of the population were below the poverty line, including 27.6% of those under age 18 and 14.3% of those 65 or over.

== Economy ==
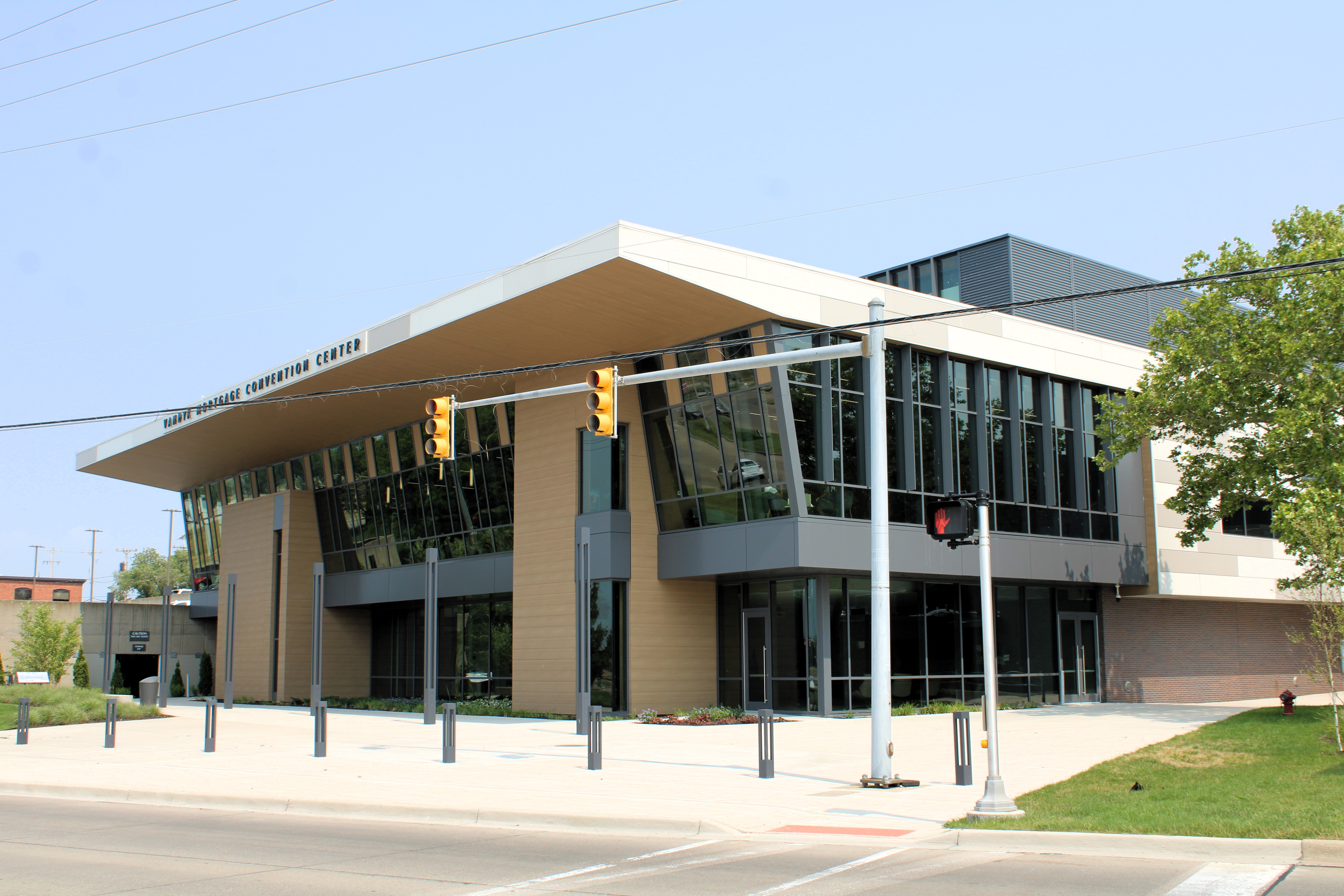
VanDyk Mortgage Convention Center

Downtown Muskegon serves as the hub for much of Muskegon County. Positioned along the southern shoreline of Muskegon Lake, it stretches for nearly two miles. Downtown is home to a number of hotels, a 25,000-square-foot convention center completed in 2021, and the Trinity Health Arena. The Muskegon Farmer's Market welcomes more than 10,000 visitors every Saturday in the summer, and the boutique incubator shops and chalets on Western Avenue are a popular attraction for residents and tourists looking to support small businesses.

== Arts and culture ==
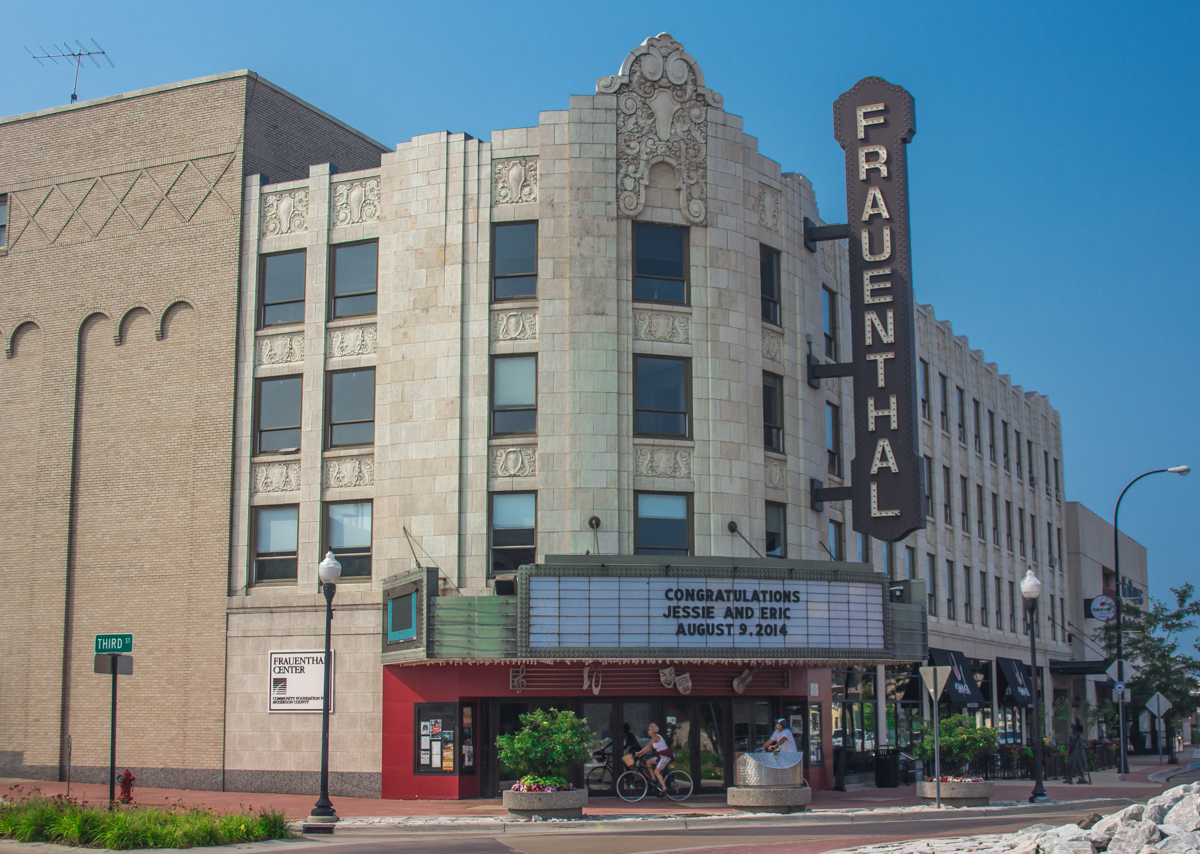
Frauenthal Center for the Performing Arts

Muskegon is home to several historical war ships and vessels. The USS Silversides Submarine Museum which features USS Silversides, a World War II submarine; USS LST-393, a World War II tank landing ship; and USCGC McLane, a Prohibition-era United States Coast Guard cutter. In addition, Muskegon also berths Milwaukee Clipper, a former passenger ship built in 1904 that traveled the same route as Lake Express does today.

The Frauenthal Center for the Performing Arts includes two theaters, the main historic Frauenthal house and the smaller Beardsley Theater in the adjoining Hilt Building. It was refurbished in 1998 and again in 2021, and hosts JAM Theatrical productions, Muskegon Civic Theatre productions, and is home of the West Michigan Symphony Orchestra. The Frauenthal was originally built as the Michigan Theater in 1929.

The Muskegon Museum of Art opened in 1912. Among the highlights of its permanent collection is Tornado Over Kansas, by John Steuart Curry. Muskegon has a growing collection of publicly owned and displayed art pieces. More than two dozen pieces are on permanent display, predominately in the downtown area.

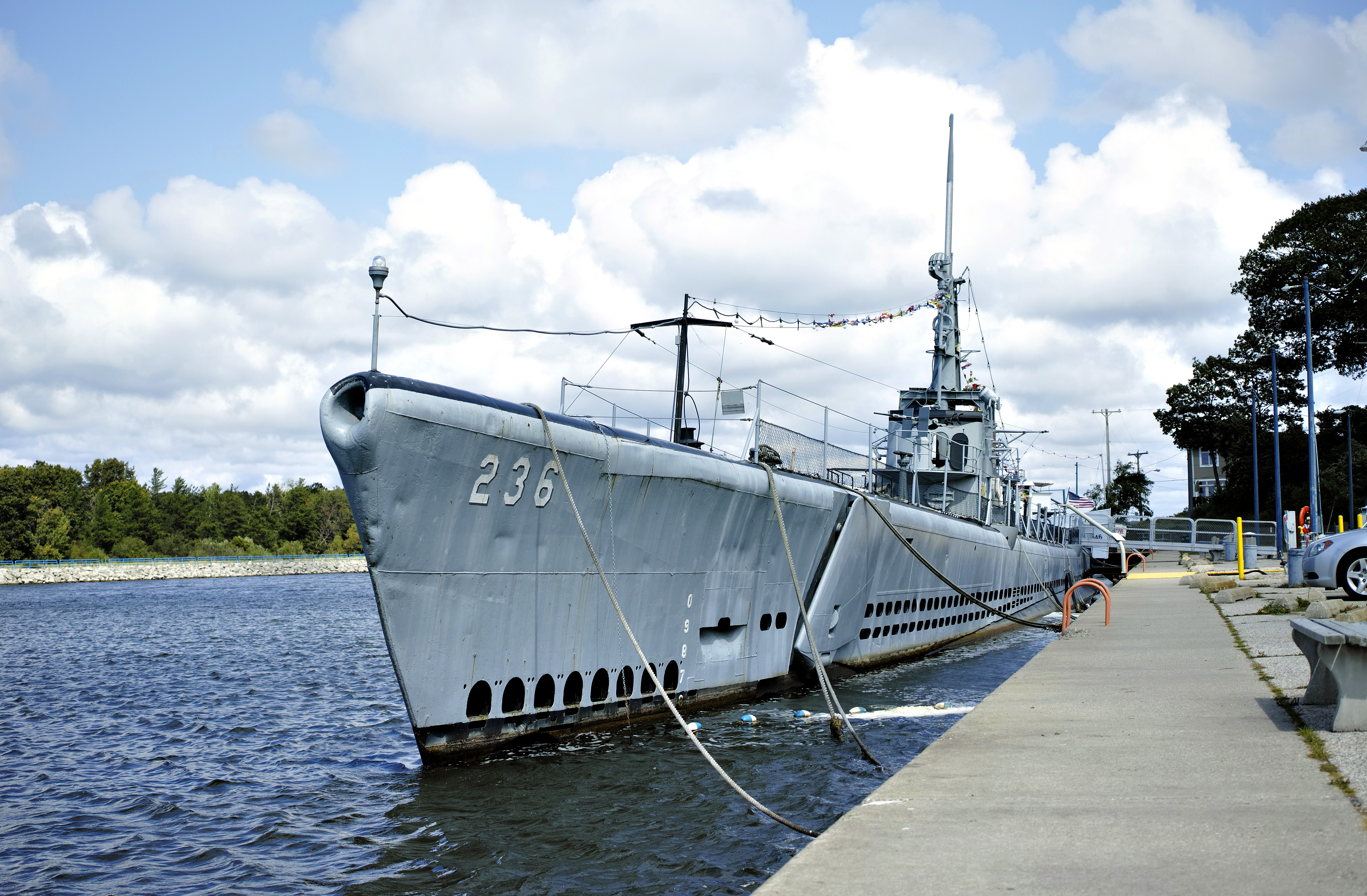
USS Silversides at the USS Silversides Submarine Museum

Lakeshore Museum Center and Hackley & Hume Historic Site, built by Muskegon's lumber barons, are restored and open to the public. The Hackley & Hume mansions are part of downtown Muskegon's Heritage Village—two blocks from Muskegon Lake, and a National Register Historic District. The mansions are operated with the Lakeshore Museum Center, which details the history of Muskegon County, from the Potawatomi and Odawa Native American tribes and lakeside fur traders to the Lumber Queen of the World to today.

=== Festivals ===
Events held in the town include:

- Taste of Muskegon in June
- Parties in the Park, every Friday from June to August at Hackley Park
- The Lakeshore Art Festival in June
- WeDiscover Festival in July, a two-day festival of electronic dance music, import and luxury cars, food, fireworks and family activities.
- Motorcycle rally in July
- Burning Foot Beer Festival held at Pere Marquette Beach
- The Unity Christian Music Festival in August at Heritage Landing
- The Michigan Irish Music Festival in September at Heritage Landing
- The Muskegon Polish Festival on Labor Day weekend.
- The International Buster Keaton Society annual convention in October.

=== Fraternal Organizations ===
Fraternal organizations are significant part of life in Western Michigan. Clubs with active memberships include:

- Independent Order of Vikings
- Fraternal Order of Eagles
- Knights of Columbus
- Polish Falcons
- Lithuanian Club
- Muskegon Recreational Club
- Lakeside Veterans Club

== Sports ==
Club	Sport	League	Venue
Muskegon Lumberjacks	Ice hockey	United States Hockey League	Trinity Health Arena
West Michigan Ironmen	Indoor football	American Arena League	Trinity Health Arena
Muskegon Risers SC	Soccer	UPSL & Premier Arena Soccer League	Trinity Health Arena and Kehern Stadium

Previous sports teams to play in Muskegon have included:

Club	Sport	Played from	League	Stadium
Muskegon Lumberjacks/Fury (1992–2010)	Hockey	1992−2010	IHL, UHL	Mercy Health Arena
Muskegon Thunder	Indoor football	2007−2009	IFL	Mercy Health Arena
Michigan Mayhem	Basketball	2004−2006	CBA	Mercy Health Arena
Muskegon Lumberjacks (1984–1992)	Hockey	1984−1992	IHL	Mercy Health Arena
Muskegon Mohawks	Hockey	1965−1984	IHL	Mercy Health Arena
Muskegon Zephyrs	Hockey	1960−1965	IHL	Mercy Health Arena
Muskegon Lassies	Baseball	1946−1949	AAGPBL	Marsh Field

The Seaway Run is run every year in late June. It features a 15k race, 5k race, 5k walk for fun, 15k wheelchair race.

== Parks and recreation ==
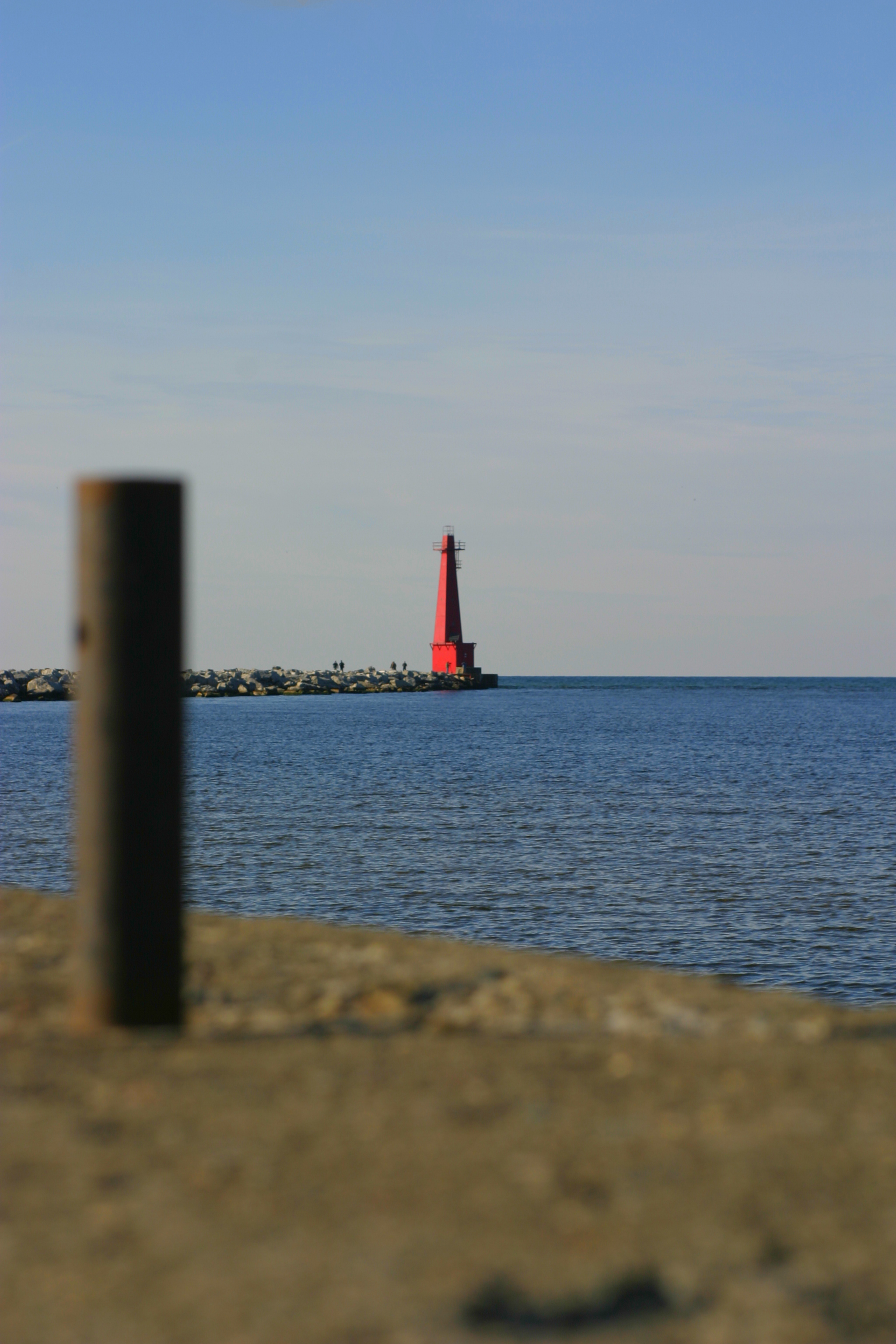
Muskegon Break Water Light on Lake Michigan

Pere Marquette Beach is the largest free public beach on the eastern shore of Lake Michigan. Windsurfing, kite boarding competitions, and professional volleyball tournaments are held there. Its quartz sand beach is expansive and bordered by large sand dunes. The beach area is popular with cyclists, runners, and hikers, and families. It faces to the west so sunsets are remarkable.

Muskegon Lakeshore Bike Trail allows for biking along the shores of Muskegon Lake to Lake Michigan, with two trails for bike paths, one on the east side of Muskegon and the other along the north side, which northerly connects to other trails, such as the Hart-Montague Bike Trail, making it possible to bike from Muskegon to Hart, Michigan, without ever leaving a bike trail.

Muskegon State Park has a Winter Sports Complex that features ice fishing, cross-country skiing, ice skating, and a luge track. P.J. Hoffmaster State Park has many sand dunes as well as two campgrounds and a public beach.

Michigan's Adventure, the largest amusement park in the state, is in Muskegon County, a few miles north of the city of Muskegon. Michigan's Adventure features a midway with roller coasters, other rides, amusements, and a full water park.

Muskegon Country Club was founded in 1908 and features a course design by Tom Bendelow and a course redesign by Donald Ross.

== Government ==
The city operates under a Commission-Manager form of local government. A seven-member city commission, comprising a mayor and six commissioners, serves as the legislative and executive branch. Four commissioners are elected from wards, while two commissioners are elected at large. The mayor is also elected at large and serves as chairman of the commission. The city commission hires a city manager to manage the daily operations of the city.

== Education ==
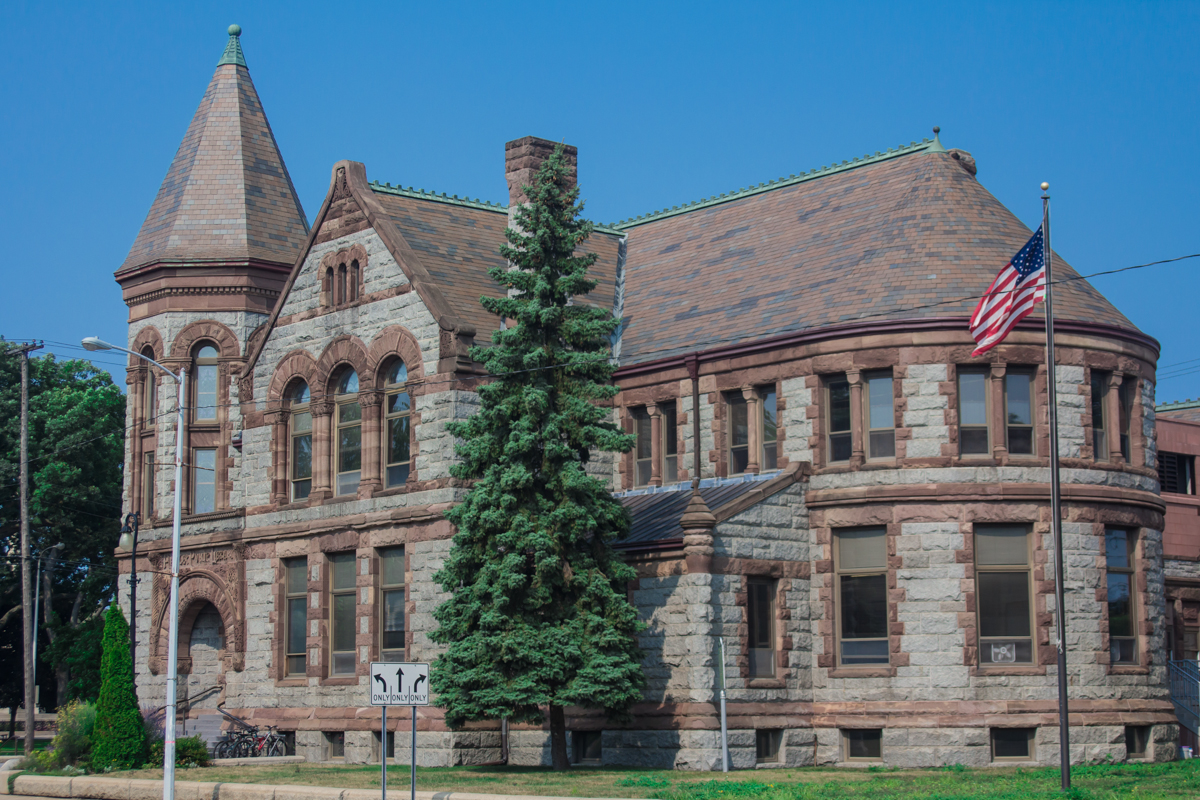
Hackley Library

Muskegon Public Schools was founded in 1860 and serves students from preschool through grade 12. Additionally, it runs the Muskegon Training and Education Center. Muskegon is also served by these private K-12 schools: Muskegon Catholic Central, Fruitport Calvary Christian, and Western Michigan Christian.

Muskegon is also served by Muskegon Community College and Baker College. Western Michigan University, Ferris State University, and Grand Valley State University all operate programs out of the Stevenson Center for Higher Education on the Muskegon Community College campus.

== Media ==
Muskegon's leading newspaper is The Muskegon Chronicle. The Chronicle is a daily newspaper owned by Booth Newspapers. It started publication in 1857.

Muskegon is served by the local television station WMKG-CD.

The Muskegon area is also served by several radio stations. WUVS-LP 103.7 is a popular urban (hip-hop/R&B) and gospel station with local programming as well as Sunday religious programming and local-based talk. Another local low-powered FM station is WUGM-LP 106.1, owned by the Muskegon Training and Education Center, which airs an Urban Oldies format dubbed "M-TEC 106 FM, Rock 'n' Soul." A Newer LP-FM Station WFFR-LP 100.9 also offers local programming along with a classic hits format. The station is based out of nearby Roosevelt Park. Other local FM stations include 90.3 WBLV-FM (classical/jazz/NPR), 91.7 WMCQ-FM (religious), WWSN FM 92.5 (adult contemporary), WGVS-FM 95.3 (public radio), WLAW-FM FM 97.5 (country), WLCS-FM 98.3 (oldies), WVIB-FM 100.1 (urban contemporary), WMRR-FM 101.7 (classic rock), WSNX-FM 104.5 (top 40, studios in Grand Rapids), WOOD-FM 106.9 (news/talk, simulcast of WOOD-AM 1300/Grand Rapids), and WMUS FM 107.9 (country). Other local AM stations aside from WKBZ include WSMZ 850, WLAW 1490 (country).

== Transportation ==
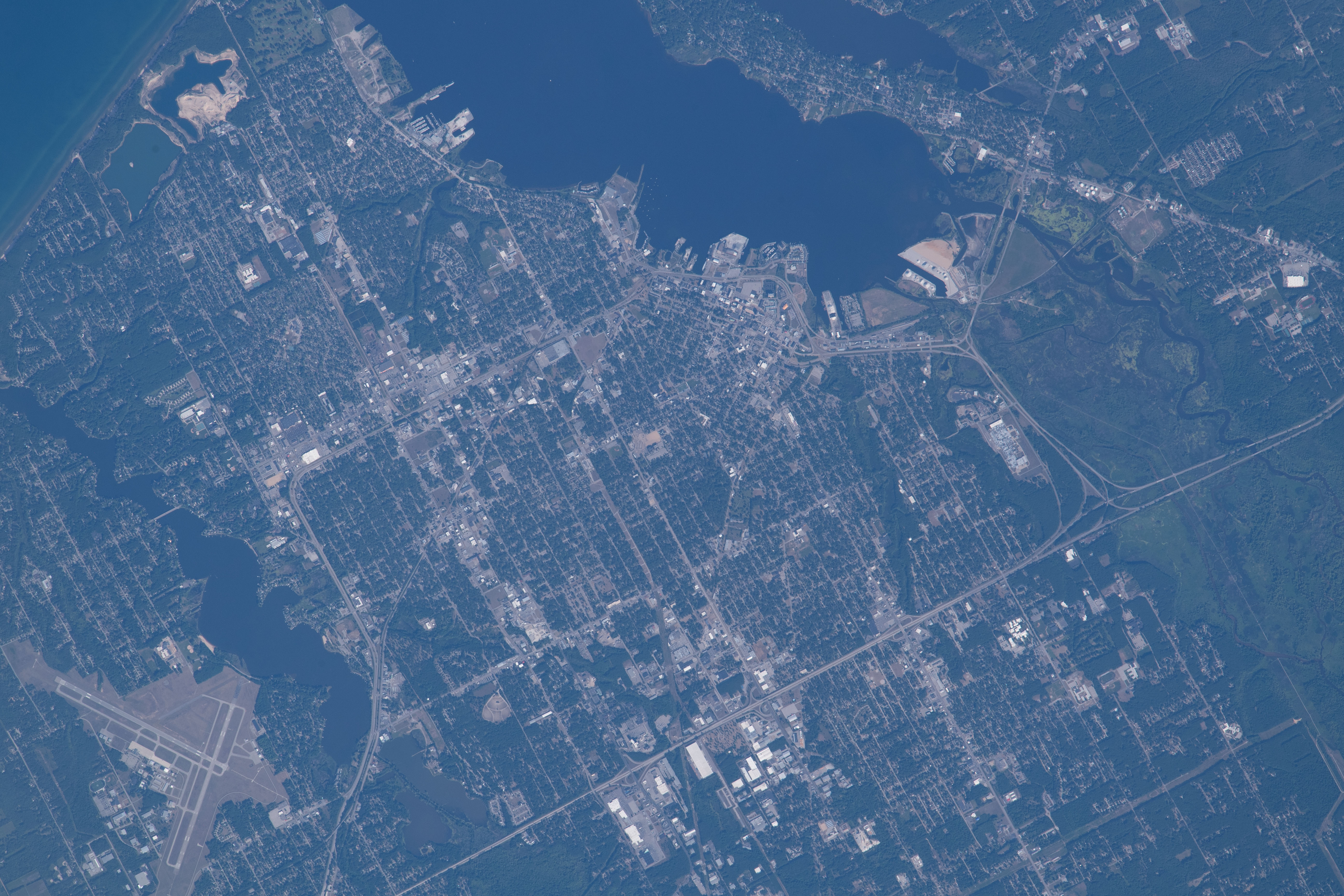
Muskegon as seen from the International Space Station in 2022

Public transportation is provided by the Muskegon Area Transit System (MATS – "The Shore Line"), which operates nine bus routes, three trolley routes, and a paratransit system. MATS serves the Herman Ivory Passenger Terminal.

MATS operates the Muskegon Trolley Company. Three routes cover the north side, south side, and downtown; each trolley stops at 11 locations, including Hackley and Hume Historic Site, USS Silversides, and Muskegon State Park.

Greyhound Lines operated out of downtown Muskegon for many years as the end point of their cross-state route along I-96 to Detroit. Services were suspended during the severe downturn in travel during the COVID Pandemic of 2020. While regional bus carrier Indian Trails picked up the bulk of Greyhound’s former Michigan services, no intercity coach service has been restored to Muskegon as of 2025.

Commercial air service is currently provided by Denver Air Connection operating regional jet flights at Muskegon County Airport (MKG), with nonstop service to Chicago O'Hare Airport. Other airlines provide passenger service via the Gerald R. Ford International Airport (GRR) in Grand Rapids.

Muskegon is the eastern port of the Lake Express High-Speed Car Ferry that crosses Lake Michigan to Milwaukee, Wisconsin offering three roundtrips a day in the summer, and two roundtrips in the fall.

=== Major roads ===
Several major highways serve the city, including:

Interstates

- I-96

U.S. Highways

- US 31
- Bus. US 31, a business loop

Other state highways

- M-46
- M-120

=== Rail ===
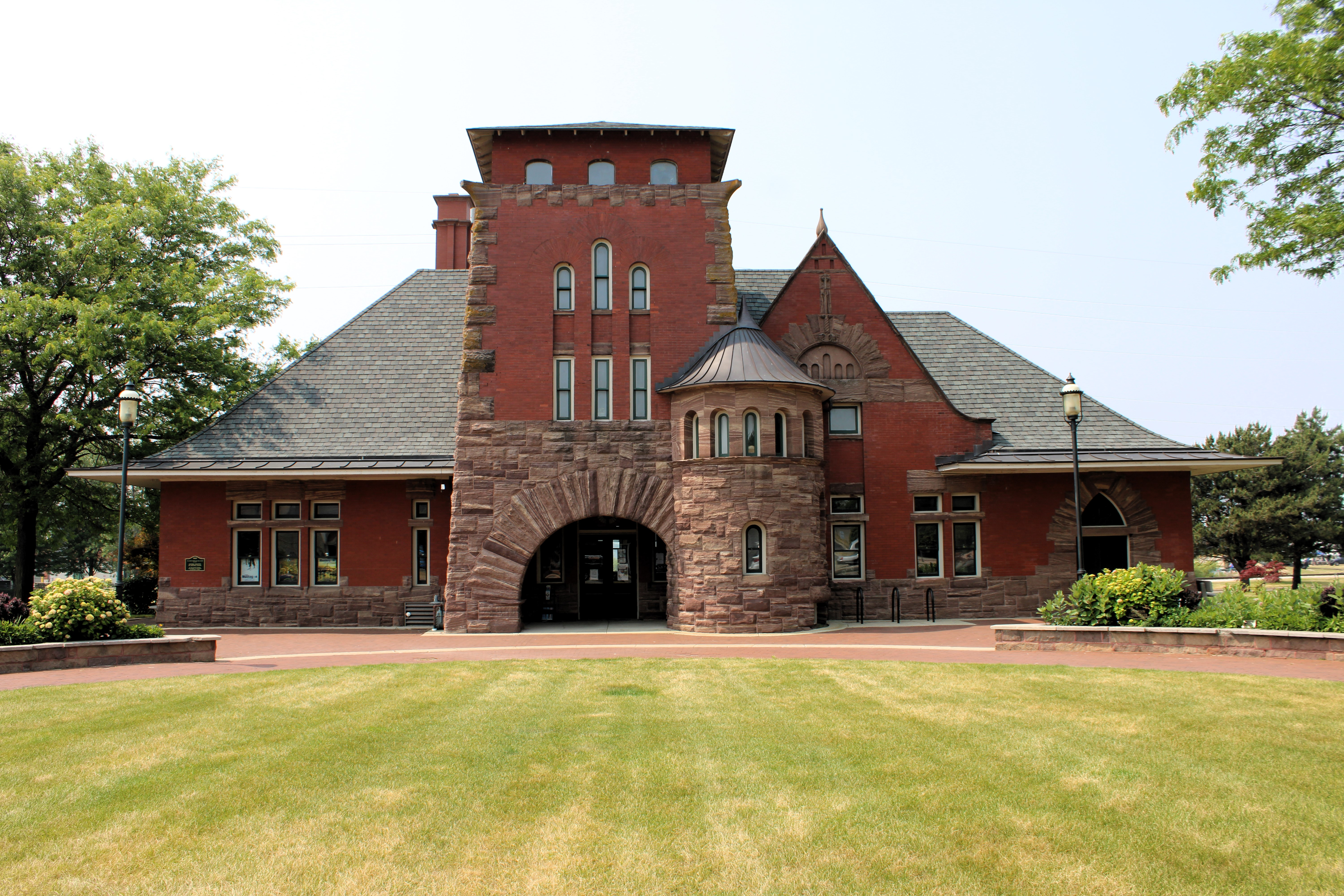
Union Depot

The Michigan Shore Railway provides freight rail service for many of Muskegon's industries. Passenger rail services ended in 1971 with the advent of Amtrak; the Chesapeake and Ohio Railroad’s routes in Michigan were not included in the initial Amtrak system. The nearest passenger rail available is via Amtrak in nearby Holland, or Grand Rapids. Until 1971, the Chesapeake & Ohio Railway (successor to the Pere Marquette Railway) operated day and night trains from Union Station to Holland and Chicago. The C&O became a unit of Chessie System in 1973 and subsequently CSX Transportation in 1987. CSX leased their Muskegon area lines to MS in 2005. The Grand Trunk Western and the Pennsylvania Railroad had earlier operated passenger trains out of another Muskegon station to various points in Michigan.

=== Ferries ===
In 1937, the Grand Trunk Western began operating ferries that met up with train and carried passengers and automobiles across Lake Michigan to Milwaukee. Earlier, the GTW had operated the ferries out of Grand Haven. The GTW stopped operating the ferries in 1978. The last remaining ferries across the lake would be the ones launching from Ludington, Michigan until the Lake Express first came into service on June 1, 2004.

== Notable people ==
- John Beyrle, son of Joseph Beyrle, U.S. ambassador to the Russian Federation; confirmed July 3, 2008
- Joseph Beyrle, only soldier to have served in both the US Army and the Soviet Army in World War II
- Nancy Anne Fleming, Miss America 1961
- Seth Privacky, murderer
- Vonda Kay Van Dyke, Miss America 1965
- Captain Jonathan Walker, "The Man With the Branded Hand" abolitionist

Business and politics

- Margaret Bailey Chandler, community leader and member of the Little River Band of Ottawa Indians
- Tudor Dixon, politician
- Charles Hackley (1837–1905), lumber baron, philanthropist (Hackley Hospital, Hackley Library, Hackley Administration Building, Hackley Avenue, Hackley Art Gallery, Hackley Park). After a gift of $12 million to the community, the city of Muskegon considered changing its name to "Hackleyville".

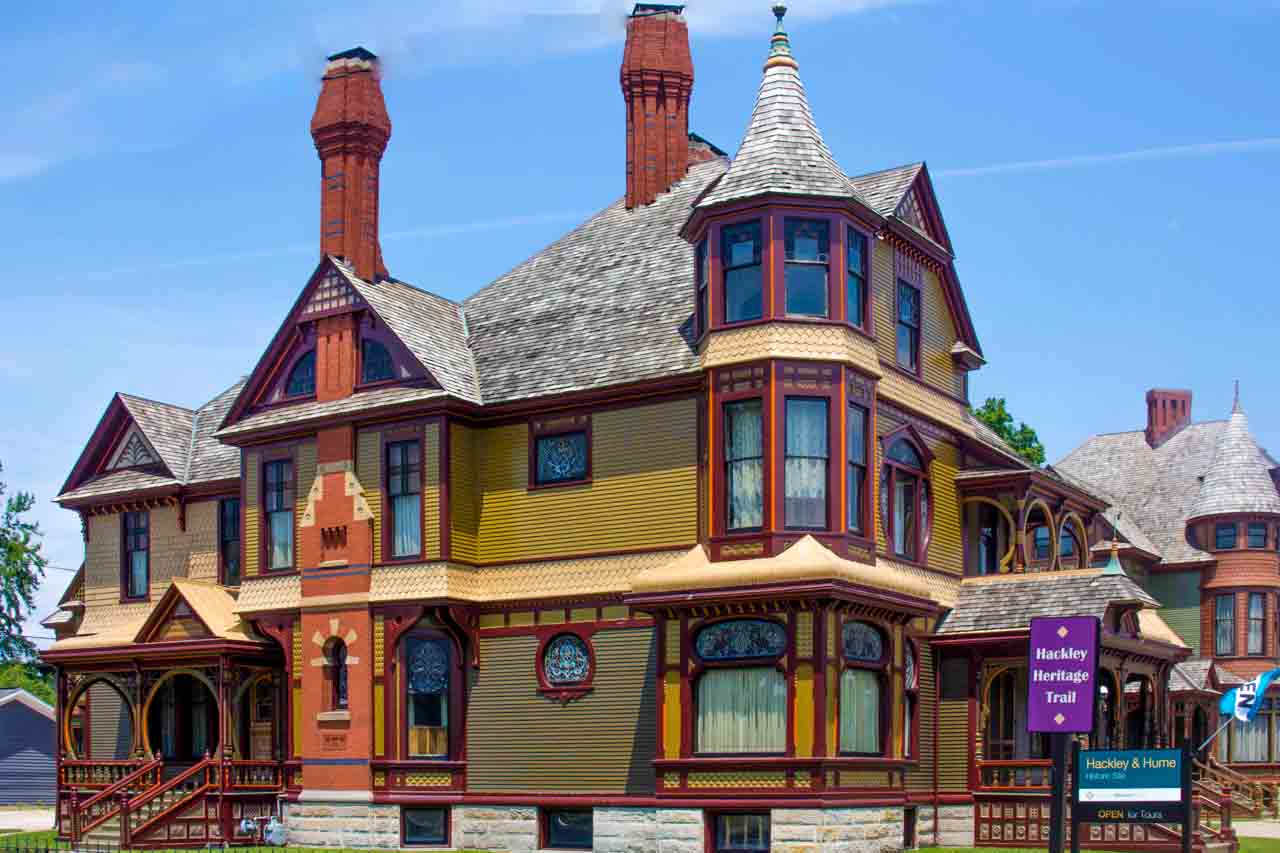
Charles Hackley House

- Richard Mell, politician

Religion

- Jim Bakker, TV evangelist
- Edmund Cardinal Szoka, cardinal, President Emeritus of the Pontifical Commission for Vatican City State

Science and technology

- Heber Doust Curtis (1872-1942), astronomer
- Clara H. Hasse (1880–1926), botanist
- David Leestma, astronaut
- W. Wesley Peterson, mathematician and computer scientist, invented the Cyclic Redundancy Check (CRC)

Artists

- Haddon Sundblom, graphic artist, created popular images of Santa Claus for Coca-Cola

Authors

- Laurie Keller, children's book writer and illustrator best known for The Scrambled States of America and Grandpa Gazillion's Number Yard
- Douglas Malloch, the “lumberman’s poet”
- John Frederick Nims, poet
- Cathy O'Brien, conspiracy theorist and author
- Lewis B. Smedes, theologian and author
- Bob Wood, author of Dodger Dogs to Fenway Franks and Big Ten Country

Music

- Børns, singer and songwriter, born in Muskegon
- Steve Gorman, drummer, Black Crowes, born in Muskegon
- Rick Johnson, musician, bass player for Mustard Plug
- Bettye LaVette, soul singer
- Iggy Pop, punk rock icon
- Louise Cooper Spindle, composer
- Wayne Static, lead singer and guitarist for industrial metal band Static-X
- Bill Szymczyk, music producer of the Eagles, The Who and others
- Gerry Teifer, music publisher, songwriter, performer
- Richard Versalle, opera singer

Stage

- Carly Jibson, Broadway and television actress, played Tracy Turnblad in the first national tour company of Hairspray and originated the role of Pepper in the musical Cry Baby
- Buster Keaton, iconic comedian and film director; born in Kansas and spent childhood summers in Muskegon with his family in the Muskegon Actors' Colony. A vaudevillian who traveled constantly except in summer, Keaton regarded Muskegon as his home town.
- Kate Reinders, Broadway actress, played Glinda in Wicked and Caroline in Good Vibrations

Television

- Matt Crouch, film producer and CEO of TBN
- Harry Morgan, versatile stage, film and TV actor, played Colonel Potter on the TV series M*A*S*H (1972–1983)
- Frank Stanton, former president of CBS
- Quincy Isaiah, actor and former football player, played Magic Johnson in the HBO series Winning Time: The Rise of the Lakers Dynasty
- Beth Smith and Jerry Smith, fictional characters from television series Rick and Morty

Sports

- Justin Abdelkader, NHL player, Detroit Red Wings
- Curtis Adams, NFL player, San Diego Chargers
- Beatrice Allard, All-American Girls Professional Baseball League player
- Virginia Bell, served in the Women's Army Corps in Japan during World War II and later joined the All-American Girls Professional Baseball League
- Donna Cook, AAGPBL player
- Doris Cook, AAGPBL player
- Deyonta Davis, NBA player, Memphis Grizzlies
- Miss Dougal, AAGPBL player, 1953 Muskegon Belles
- Tony Ferguson, winner of Ultimate Fighter Season 13
- Mike Garvey, racing driver
- Bill Green, former United States and NCAA record holder in Track and Field, 5th place in 1984 Olympic Games in the hammer throw. His father William Hipkiss (1932-2008) was an attorney and resident of Muskegon for 40 years
- Bobby Grich, MLB All-Star second baseman for the Baltimore Orioles and California Angels
- Mark Grimmette, men's double luge, winner of Olympic silver (2002) and bronze (1998) medals
- Mark Hughes, basketball player and coach
- Ronald Johnson, University of Southern California and San Francisco 49ers wide receiver
- Dasha Kovalova, professional bowler and five-time PWBA Tour champion (born in Ukraine and now resides in Muskegon)
- Alta Little, AAGPBL player
- Ruvell Martin, NFL player for the Seattle Seahawks
- Nate McCrary, NFL running back for the Baltimore Ravens
- Beulah McGillicutty, manager in Extreme Championship Wrestling
- Nate McLouth, MLB player for the Washington Nationals
- Earl Morrall, Michigan State and NFL quarterback, three-time Super Bowl champion
- Robert Morse, NFL player for the New Orleans Saints
- Drew Naymick, professional basketball player
- Don Nelson, NBA player for Boston Celtics and coach in Basketball Hall of Fame, University of Iowa basketball player
- Ray Newman, MLB pitcher
- Bennie Oosterbaan, three-time University of Michigan All-American football player and head coach
- Kalil Pimpleton, New York Giants wide receiver
- Marley Shriver, Olympic swimmer
- Terrance Taylor, Detroit Lions defensive tackle
- Anthony Bradford, American football, Right Guard LSU, Seattle Seahawks

== Sister cities ==
- Ōmuta, Fukuoka Prefecture, Japan
- Hartlepool, County Durham, United Kingdom
- Antalya, Turkey

== See also ==
- Michigan Heritage Park
