= Muskegon Area Transit System =

Public transit system in Muskegon County, Michigan, USA

- Headquarters: 2624 Sixth St.
- Locale: Muskegon, Michigan
- Service area: Muskegon County, Michigan
- Service type: bus service, paratransit
- Routes: 7
- Hubs: Herman Ivory Terminal, 351 Morris Ave.
- Daily ridership: 900 (weekdays, Q4 2024)
- Annual ridership: 247,500 (2024)
- Website: matsbus.com

The Muskegon Area Transit System (MATS) is the primary provider of mass transportation in Muskegon County, Michigan. Service is provided from Monday through Friday along seven routes. The agency also provides a Complementary ADA Paratransit Service that operates within 3/4 mile of the fixed routes. A micro-transit service called Go2 provides on-demand service Monday-Saturday. Go2 is sponsored by MATS and provided by Via. In 2024, the system had a ridership of 247,500, or about 900 per weekday as of the fourth quarter of 2024.

== Route list ==
- A: Route 1
- B: Route 2
- C: Route 11
- D: Route 12
- E: Route 21
- F: Route 22
- G: Route 31

== Herman Ivory Terminal ==
The Herman Ivory Terminal, located at 351 Morris Avenue, is the primary transfer hub for MATS. The $2.8 million facility opened August 1, 2015 with space for MATS and for Greyhound Lines buses and includes an indoor waiting area and customer service desk. The bus terminal replaced a previous one on the same site, after nine months of construction and over a decade of planning.

== See also ==
- List of bus transit systems in the United States
- Lake Express
- Muskegon station
