= List of mayors of Muskegon, Michigan =

The following is a list of mayors of the city of Muskegon, Michigan, USA.

- Chauncey Davis, 1870, 1872
- Joseph Ireland, 1871
- Henry H. Getty, 1873
- Samuel H. Wagner, 1874
- William Glue, 1875
- Oliver P. Pillsbury, 1876-1877
- Henry H. Holt, 1878-1879
- Francis Jiroch, 1880-1881
- Nelson DeLong, 1882-1883
- Francis W. Cook, 1884
- Samuel H. Stevens, 1885
- Lyman G. Mason, 1886
- John Torrent, 1887-1888
- Martin Waalkes, 1889-1891
- James Gow, 1892
- John Torrent, 1893
- Newcomb McGraft, 1894
- William Leahy, 1895
- L. A. Smith, 1896
- Ansel F. Temple, 1897
- James Balbirnie, 1898-1899
- Frank Alberts, 1900
- William Moore, 1901
- Theodore D. Morgan, 1902
- Leonard Eyke, 1903-1904
- R. Andrew Fleming, 1905
- Norman B. Lawson, 1906
- John Campbell, 1907-1908
- Harry A. Rietdyk, 1909-1912
- John H. Moore, 1913-1914
- Arnt Ellifson, 1915-1917
- James L. Smith, 1918
- John H. Moore, 1919
- Paul R. Beardsley, 1920-1921
- H. E. Langeland, 1922
- Archibald Hadden, 1923-1924
- Lincoln Estes, ca.1925
- George Vanderwerp, ca.1937
- Edwin J. Quick, ca.1952
- John E. Medendorp, ca.1953-1954
- William E. Steiner, ca.1955-1956
- Don F. Seyferth 1958-1960
- Donald E. Johnson, ca.1967
- Stephen Warmington, ca.2002-2006
- Kenneth D. Johnson, 2022-2025

== See also ==
- Muskegon history
