= West Michigan Symphony Orchestra =

American orchestra

The West Michigan Symphony (formerly the West Shore Symphony Orchestra) is a professional orchestra made up of 60 core musicians. It performs at the Frauenthal Center for the Performing Arts in Muskegon, Michigan. The orchestra performs eight concerts annually, featuring a diverse repertoire and guest artists.

== History ==
A. M. Courtright, a Muskegon Heights teacher, and Palmer Quackenbush played a key role in the early efforts to establish a symphony orchestra in Muskegon. In November 1939, a musical group of 50 members presented its first concert, with Quackenbush conducting and Courtright assisting. The group incorporated the following year and elected its first board of directors.

Performances were initially held in area schools before moving to the historic Frauenthal Theater in the late 1970s. Built in 1929, the 1724-seat Frauenthal Center for the Performing Arts underwent a $7.5 million renovation that restored its original Spanish Renaissance styling while also creating a lobby linking it with the adjacent 180-seat Beardsley Theatre.

On 15 May 2013, the symphony moved its offices into new headquarters on the second floor of the Russell Block Building at 360 West Western Avenue.

== Music direction ==
The West Michigan Symphony has had nine conductors. The incumbent director of music, Scott Speck, has served with the orchestra since 2002.

Conductors of the West Michigan Symphony Orchestra
	Tenure
Palmer Quackenbush	1939-49
Tauno Hannikainen	1949-51
Hugo Kolberg	1951-56
Wayne L. Dunlap	1956-59
Lyman A. Starr, Sr.	1959-61
John L. Wheeler	1961-77
Philip Greenberg	1977-81
Murray Gross	1982-2001
Scott Speck	since 2002

== Governance and Management ==
Fewer than six weeks after the first concert was held on 28 November 1939, representatives from Grand Haven and Muskegon began to develop by-laws and form a permanent board of directors for the symphony.

Discussions regarding the management of a professional orchestra were first recorded in the minutes of the board meeting held on 23 August 1944. Harriet Damm, chairwoman of the board, announced at the meeting that Robert Sanborn "was willing to try to be orchestra manager." Sanborn's initial responsibilities included attendance recording at rehearsals and concerts, distribution and collection of scores and music racks, and tuning the piano.

Sanborn remained manager until 1984 when he was replaced by Susan Schwartz. Several individuals, notably all women, have served as managers of the orchestra over the years. In 1996, the title of "manager" was replaced with "executive" with the hiring of Gretchen Cheney-Rhoades. Upon her resignation in 2004, the title was revised to be president and CEO, and Brenda Nienhouse was the first individual to hold the new title. Nienhouse was selected after a nationwide search that drew 41 candidates.

Andy Buelow, the orchestra's current president and CEO, joined in January 2018. Buelow succeeded former president and CEO Carla Hill, who left the orchestra in June 2017, and interim executive director Kay Olthoff, who filled the position in Hill's absence. His prior experience in orchestral management includes serving as executive director of Symphony Tacoma and Traverse Symphony Orchestra, as well as public relations manager of Milwaukee Symphony Orchestra.

Executives of the West Michigan Symphony Orchestra
	Tenure	Title
Robert Sanborn	1944-84	Orchestra Manager
Susan Schwartz	1984-85	Orchestra Manager
Barbara Klingman	1985-86	Orchestra Manager
Janet Smith	1986-96	Orchestra Manager
Gretchen Cheney-Rhoades	1996-2004	Executive
Brenda Nienhouse	2004-05	President and CEO
Carla Hill	2005-2017	President and CEO
Andy Buelow	2018–Present	President and CEO
