= Frauenthal Center for the Performing Arts =

Performing arts center in Muskegon, Michigan, United States

Coordinates: 43.23486°N 86.25316°W

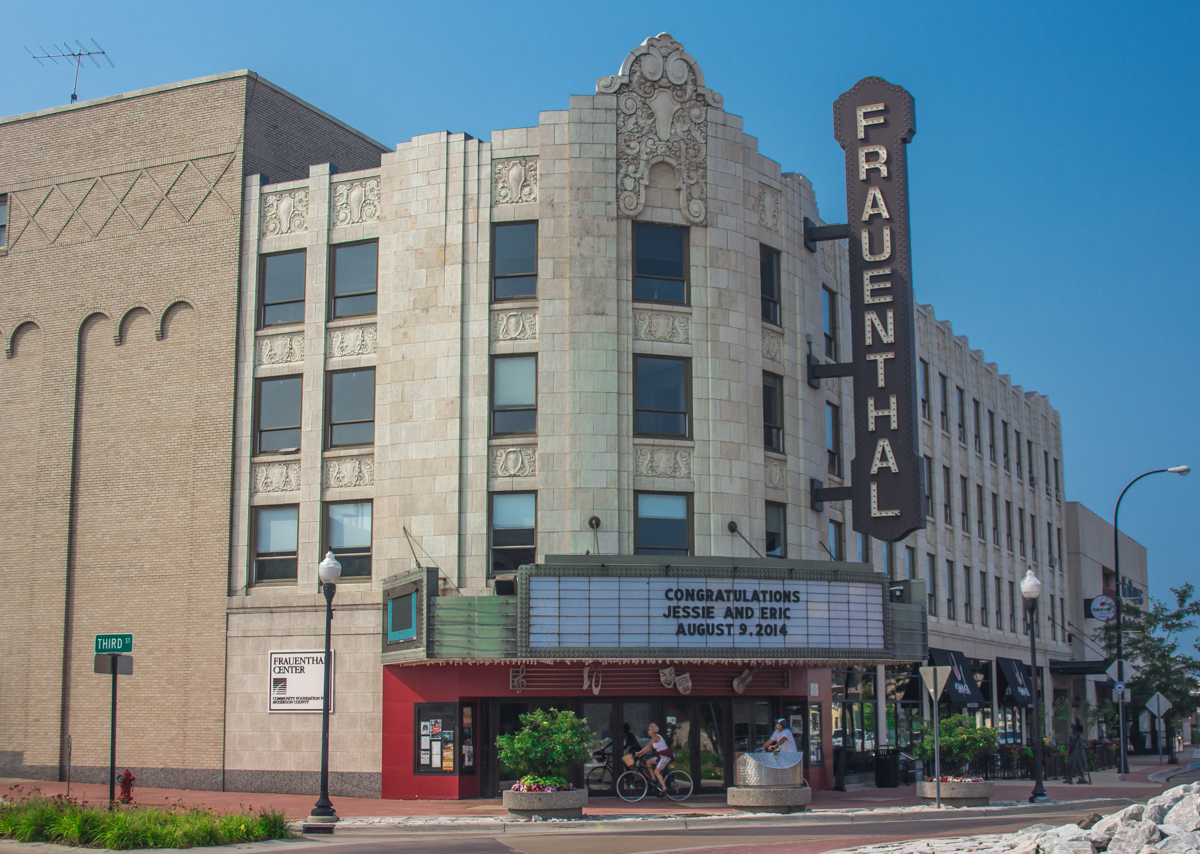
- View of the marquee from Third St and Western Ave
- Interactive map of Frauenthal Center for the Performing Arts
- Former names: Michigan Theater
- Address: 425 West Western Avenue; Muskegon, Michigan; United States

Construction
- Opened: September 17, 1930; 96 years ago
- Expanded: 1984

Website
- frauenthal.org

The Frauenthal Center for Performing Arts is located in downtown Muskegon in the U.S. state of Michigan. It consists of the Frauenthal Theater, formerly the Michigan Theater, and additional performance, exhibition, and support spaces in the Hilt Building. The Frauenthal Theater opened as the Michigan Theater in 1930 and was one of 17 theaters in downtown Muskegon. Today, it serves as a cultural center for Muskegon, under the management of the Community Foundation for Muskegon County.

== Programming ==
The Frauenthal Center's programming includes live music, theater, dance, film, and comedy, featuring local and touring artists. The West Michigan Symphony Orchestra and the Muskegon Civic Theatre host their seasons at the Frauenthal. Annual events include the Miss Michigan pageant and the Mona Shores Singing Christmas Tree choir show. The theater also hosts a free monthly movie series and an art gallery.

== Facilities ==
The Frauenthal Center includes multiple performance spaces, which support the variety of programming at the center. The 1708-seat Frauenthal Theater features the original Barton pipe organ and updated technical systems, and hosts most large performances. The 169-seat Beardsley Theater is used for smaller dramatic performances and lectures. Additional facilities include a ballroom, an art gallery, office space, and conference spaces.

== History ==
The Frauenthal Theater was built in 1929 as the Michigan Theater, at a cost of $690,000. It opened on September 17, 1930, under the management of the Schlossman Theaters chain. The theater was built at a cost of $600,000, equivalent to $11,560,000 in 2025. The Muskegon Times described it as "a marble-like monument of grace and beauty" and Muskegon's "first 100% talkies" theater.

The Michigan Theater's original Spanish Renaissance decor was painted over in the 1950s, and the Schlossman company went out of business in the 1960s. The Michigan Theater would have likely met the fate of other theaters in downtown Muskegon, if not for the efforts of the Community Foundation for Muskegon County. The foundation purchased the entire block containing the theater with a $1.5 million gift from local industrialist A. Harold Frauenthal, and renamed the theater after him.

Through the 1970s and 1980s, the Frauenthal Theatre found itself in need of additional support spaces. This prompted the conversion of an adjacent building, a former furniture store. The Hilt Building forms the newest portion of the complex, and opened in 1984, featuring the 169-seat Beardsley Theater, expanded dressing rooms and other spaces.

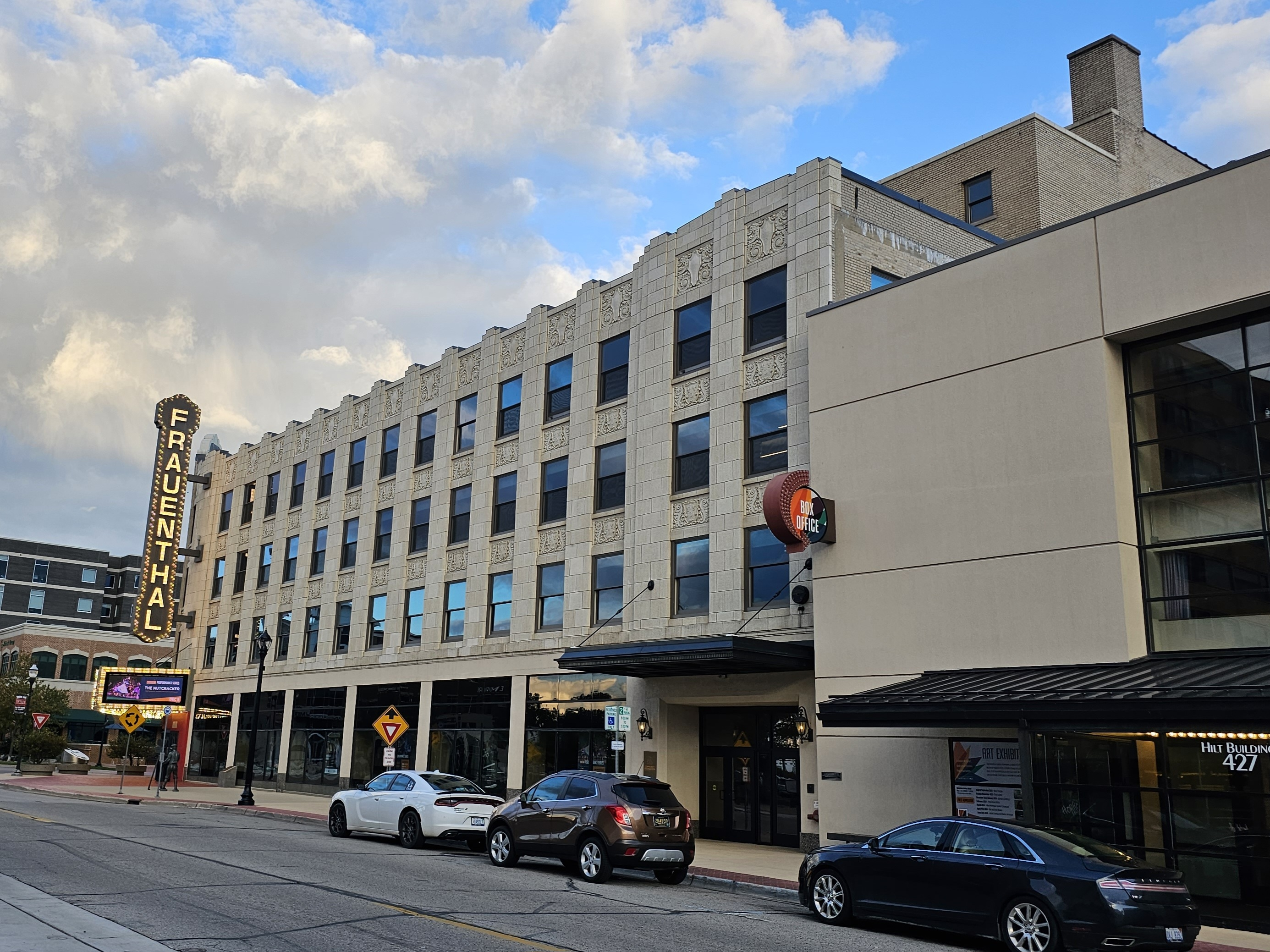
The theater in 2023

Another renovation campaign began in 1992, with the creation of a master plan for the theater. The voters of Muskegon approved a $16 million bond issue to support the renovation, which was completed in 1998. The lighting, sound, and rigging systems were updated, the original Spanish Renaissance-style decor was restored, and the lobby was expanded to connect with the Hilt Building.
