= Muskegon station =

- Union Depot
- U.S. National Register of Historic Places
- Michigan State Historic Site
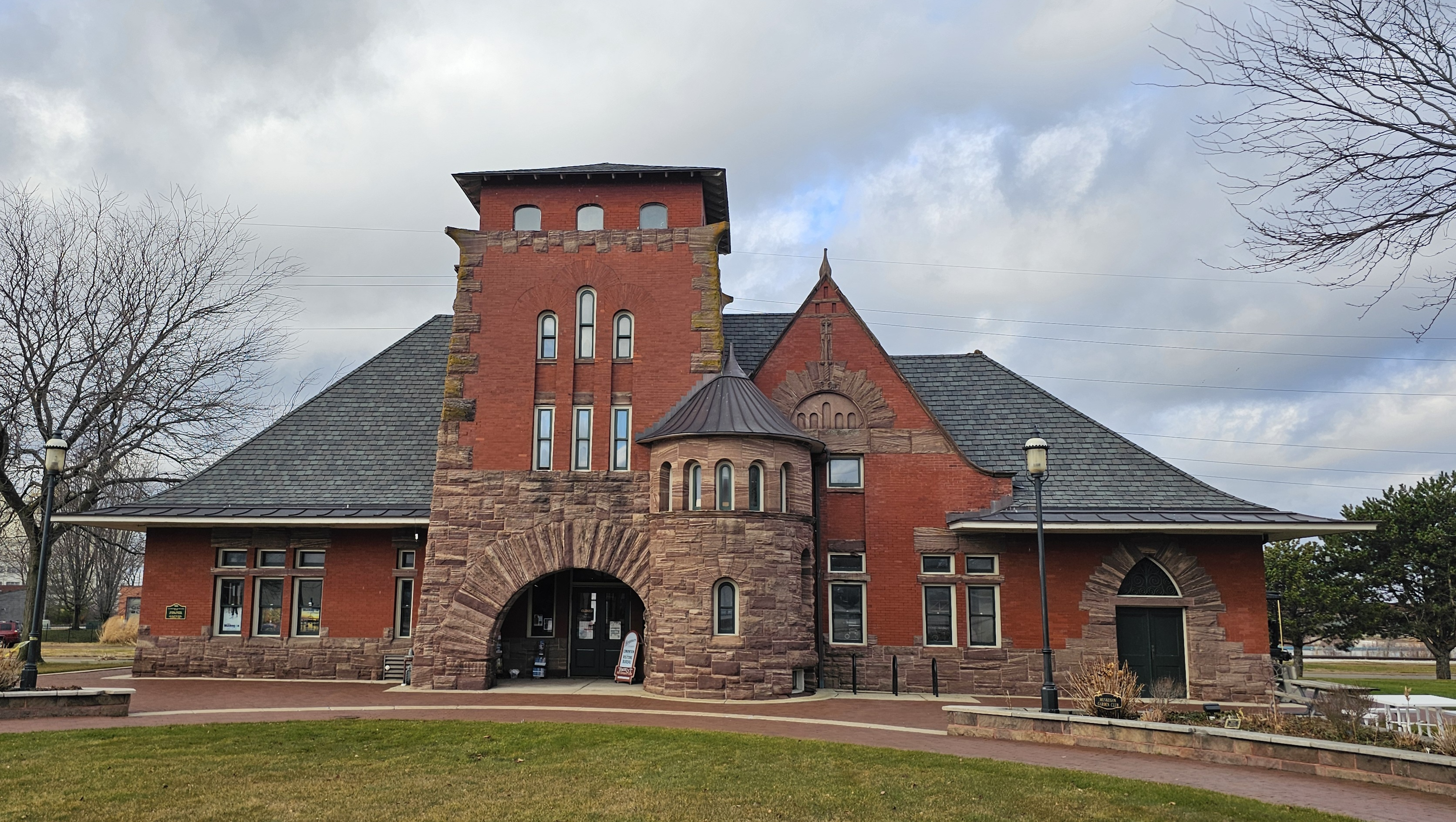
- The railway station in December 2023

- Location within Michigan Location within the United States
- Interactive map
- Location: 610 Western Ave., Muskegon, Michigan
- Coordinates: 43°13′59″N 86°15′28″W
- Area: less than one acre
- Built: 1895
- Built by: Rowson Brothers & Company
- Architect: Sidney J. Osgood, Amos W. Rush
- Architectural style: Richardsonian Romanesque
- NRHP reference No.: 00001489
- Added to NRHP: December 7, 2000

The Union Depot is a railway station located at 610 Western Avenue in Muskegon, Michigan. It was listed on the National Register of Historic Places in 2000. It is now the Muskegon County Convention & Visitor's Bureau.

== History ==
In 1871, the Michigan Lake Shore Railroad was built, connecting Muskegon with Chicago. This railroad was later folded in the Chicago and West Michigan Railroad. In the 1880s, two more rail lines were extended into Muskegon: the Grand Rapids and Indiana Railroad and the Toledo, Saginaw and Muskegon Railway. However, by the early 1890s, the depot located on Third Street was badly in need of refurbishing. In 1893, all three railways and the city agreed that constructing a new depot would be in the best interests of all parties, particularly with the rise in excursion traffic to local resorts.

In 1893, architect Sidney J. Osgood developed plans for this new depot. Architect Amos W. Rush soon took over the project, but actual construction was delayed until 1894 due to the Panic of 1893. The depot was completed and opened in 1895. The depot was taken over by the Pere Marquette Railroad, in 1899. Despite the Union Depot name, by the 1930s, the Toledo, Saginaw and Muskegon Railway (being absorbed by the Grand Trunk Western) trains were by that point using a different station in the city. By 1938, the trains of the Grand Rapids and Indiana Railroad, by then acquired by the Pennsylvania Railroad were moved over to the same station as the Grand Trunk trains. Union Depot was the destination of one of the sections of the Pere Marquette's Night Express from Chicago.

Eventually the Chesapeake and Ohio Railway (C&O) when C&O absorbed the Pere Marquette Railroad in 1947. However, with the growth of the automobile, passenger railway service declined, and the depot ceased passenger operation in 1971. Freight service continued for two more years, but the building stood vacant from 1978 until the early 1990s, when it was donated to Muskegon County. In 1990, the depot was designated as a Michigan Historic Civil Engineering Landmark by the American Society of Civil Engineers. The building was restored in 1994 and 1995, and reopened as the Muskegon County Convention & Visitor's Bureau.

== Description ==
The Muskegon Union Depot is a two-story Richardsonian Romanesque railroad station with a connected four-story tower and a massive hipped roof. The walls are constructed from red brick and rock-face sandstone, and the roof eaves flare outward from the main mass of the building. The building is nearly symmetrical, with only a portion of the structure that formerly housed the baggage room extending to one side to break the symmetry. The main entry is through a deep portico formed by a massive sandstone arch. The side elevations have overhanging roofs, creating deep entry porches that approach the platform in the rear of the building. The rear elevation contains a half-hexagonal bay formerly housing the ticket office.

On the interior, the main waiting room contains a large ornamental brick fireplace with a wood mantel, and the walls contain quarter-sawn oak woodwork and wainscot paneling with egg and dart trim. The ceiling is covered with original pressed metal panels. The original ladies' waiting room has been converted into an exhibit space, and the original gentlemen's smoking room has also been converted into an exhibit space. The second floor is less than half the size of the first floor, and was originally used as railroad offices and storage. It now contains a large conference room, small restrooms, offices, storage, and a boiler room. The upper floors of the tower are now used only for mechanical systems.

Preceding station	Chesapeake and Ohio Railway	Following station
Berry toward Pentwater	PM Pentwater – Allegan	Muskegon Heights toward Allegan
