= Michelle McKormick =

American radio personality

Michelle McKormick (born November 28, 1964) is a Grand Rapids, Michigan based talk radio personality. She is the former co-host of Mouth 2 Mouth on WOOD (AM) with Scott Winters.

McKormick is a 1985 graduate of Central Michigan University. She began her radio career at WGRD in 1984 and held a variety of positions there, including music director. She was part of GRD's morning show during the 1980s along with Denny Schaefer. She left GRD in the 1990s and did radio at WKXW in Trenton, New Jersey.

She returned to Grand Rapids in 1997 to work at WVTI-FM, now WMAX. She stayed until 2002 when she made her way to Detroit to work at WKRK with Gregg Henson. She was fired in 2006 and eventually returned to Grand Rapids. She began working at Clear Channel Communications owned WOOD-AM to cover for Winters and Rick Beckett when they were on vacation. She replaced Beckett after his untimely death in 2009.

On November 5, 2010, WOOD AM announced the cancellation of Mouth 2 Mouth. Both McKormick and Winters were fired from Clear Channel.

Michelle currently works with Michigan radio legend, Gregg Henson. "Gregg has been influential in my career and I am grateful to work with such an immense talent everyday," claimed McKormick
