= Rick Beckett =

American radio personality (1954–2009)

- Born: Richard Blaine Beckett; June 30, 1954; Kalamazoo, Michigan, U.S.
- Died: February 26, 2009 (aged 54); Grand Rapids, Michigan, U.S.
- Education: Union High School
- Occupation: Radio broadcaster

Richard Blaine Beckett (June 30, 1954 – February 26, 2009) was an American radio broadcaster.

Rick was born in Kalamazoo, Michigan and moved to Grand Rapids shortly thereafter. He began his radio career while still in high school at Union High School in Grand Rapids at WZZM-FM in 1970, where he worked part-time on weekends. His career started as a result of his involvement in a Junior Achievement program called HERO. Shortly after his graduation from high school in 1972, Rick was fired from WZZM. He moved on to WLAV and worked there until early 1973. He then received his first full-time job at WGTO-AM 540 (now WFLF (AM)) in Cypress Gardens, Florida. Beckett returned to WZZM-FM in 1976, which by this time became WZZR-FM (now WLHT). He worked evenings for the majority of his time there but eventually worked the afternoon drive.

Beckett was fired from WZZR in 1980 and moved on to do radio at WAAY-AM (now WLOR) in Huntsville, Alabama. He was fired from WAAY in mid-1984 and returned to Cypress Gardens to work at WZNG-AM (now WHNR). He was also fired from WZNG.

Beckett eventually returned to Grand Rapids and began a stint at WKLQ on their "Q Morning Zoo" program in 1987. Beckett and the other members of the "Q Zoo" (Darla Jaye and Scott Winters) left WKLQ on September 12, 1995. On September 25, 1995, the three signed on the air at WGRD. Jaye left WGRD in September 1997, but the show continued with Beckett and Winters as the main players. Beckett was fired from WGRD in August 2002, Winters was fired several weeks later. Beckett had health problems over the years, including being a recovered alcoholic, diabetes, and nerve damage in his legs due to diabetes.

In April 2003, Beckett and Winters joined the staff at WOOD (AM), where they started their talk radio career. "The Rick and Scott Show" was one of WOOD-AM's most popular programs and was a rating winner in their time slot. In 2007, they won the Michigan Association of Broadcasters award for Midday Show Broadcast Team of the Year.

On February 26, 2009, at 8:56 pm, Beckett called his girlfriend, Debra Lowe to report he was having a heart attack. She called 911 and first responders were dispatched to Beckett's house. Paramedics arrived and broke into his house to try and revive Beckett. He died a short time later at a Grand Rapids area hospital.
