= WBFX =

Coordinates: 43.041°N 85.358°W

- Grand Rapids, Michigan; United States
- Broadcast area: Grand Rapids metropolitan area
- Frequency: 101.3 MHz (HD Radio)
- Branding: 101.3 Big FM

Programming
- Format: Classic Adult contemporary

Ownership
- Owner: iHeartMedia; (iHM Licenses, LLC)
- Sister stations: WBCT; WMAX-FM; WOOD; WSNX-FM; WSRW-FM; WTKG

History
- First air date: 1962 (as WMAX-FM)
- Former call signs: WMAX-FM (1962–1965); WYON (1965–1977); WMLW (1977–1978); WFFX (1978–1980); WCUZ-FM (1980–2000)
- Call sign meaning: "Fox" (former branding)

Technical information
- Licensing authority: FCC
- Facility ID: 51727
- Class: B
- ERP: 50,000 watts
- HAAT: 128 meters (420 ft)

Links
- Public license information: Public file; LMS
- Webcast: Listen live (via iHeartRadio)
- Website: 1013big.iheart.com

WBFX (101.3 FM, "Big FM") is a commercial radio station in Grand Rapids, Michigan. It airs a adult contemporary radio format and is owned and operated by iHeartMedia, Inc. WBFX is classified an adult contemporary station, but it leans more towards classic hits. Core artists played include Michael Jackson, Prince, Madonna, George Michael, and Whitney Houston, but the station avoids more contemporary artists like Taylor Swift, Justin Bieber, and Ed Sheeran. WOOD-TV supplies some news and weather updates. WBFX also serves as the local affiliate for Detroit Lions football and Michigan State Spartans athletics. WBFX's studios and offices are at 77 Monroe Center in downtown Grand Rapids.

WBFX has an effective radiated power (ERP) of 50,000 watts, the maximum for most stations in Southern Michigan. The transmitter is near 5 Mile Road and Lincoln Lake Avenue in Lowell.

== History ==
=== Early years ===
The station signed on the air in 1962. Its original call sign was WMAX-FM. It then became WYON as a sister station to WION in Ionia, Michigan, in 1965.

In 1976, the station was purchased by the owners of WCUZ (1230 AM) and became WMLW ("Mellow 101"), a soft adult contemporary station. WMLW switched to album oriented rock as WFFX "The Fox" in 1978, and then to country music in 1980 as WCUZ-FM. It used the slogan 'CUZ-FM 101.3...more of the music you like...on CUZ-FM." For most of the 1980s, country WCUZ was among the ratings leaders in Grand Rapids. But the station saw its ratings erode after the 1992 debut of "B93", WBCT, a rival country station on 93.7.

By 1998, WCUZ was co-owned with its country competitor, WBCT. Both stations came under the umbrella of Clear Channel Communications (a forerunner of today's iHeartMedia). Clear Channel decided to keep WBCT as the contemporary country outlet, so WCUZ moved to a classic country format, identifying as "Country Gold WCUZ".

=== Classic rock ===
Clear Channel dropped the "Country Gold" format on September 24, 2000. It debuted classic rock "101.3 The Fox" that afternoon, following coverage of the MBNA.com 400 NASCAR Winston Cup event. The station changed its call letters to the current WBFX on September 27, 2000.

The lineup at the debut was The Bob & Tom Show, syndicated from Indianapolis for morning drive time. The rest of the day had local DJs, including Ranger Bob, Aris Hampers, Otto Mation and Alison Harte. Others jocks over the decade would include Matt Hendricks (AKA Big Richard), Jack Lawson, Mark Fuerie, Andy O'Riley, Shafee and Joe Daugherty. The station also featured the syndicated Nights with Alice Cooper for evenings.

Since its inception, WBFX has changed its music style multiple times, although all remained loosely in the rock genre. In late June 2009, the station adjusted its format towards mainstream rock, with a mix of harder classic rock songs as well as recent rock music from the 1990s and 2000s. This adjustment was in response to the local active rock station WKLQ changing formats to sports talk. By 2010, however, Townsquare Media's WGRD-FM adjusted its format to active rock from alternative rock, and saw a decent rise in the ratings. Meanwhile, WBFX remained roughly the same. After this, WBFX rebranded as "The Next Generation of Classic Rock", and moved its playlist back towards having a classic rock feel, but with a stronger emphasis on 1980s and 1990s era, taking on WLAV-FM.

=== The Brew ===
On February 20, 2013, WBFX began running liners advising listeners that "The Fox Dies Friday". At noon the next day, after playing "The Breakup Song" by The Greg Kihn Band and "The Final Countdown" by Europe, the station rebranded. It became "101.3 The Brew". The moniker acknowledged Grand Rapids being voted as 2012's "Beer City USA" according to a poll conducted on Examiner.com and the noteworthy rise of the popularity and economic impact of microbreweries in the region.

The station launched with "Enter Sandman" by Metallica. Musically, the station was tweaked with more rock titles from the 1980s and 1990s added into the playlist. The presentation and formatics became similar to other stations called "The Brew" that Clear Channel has deployed in places such as Portland, OR, Columbus, OH and Wichita, KS. With sister station WMAX-FM having taken the ESPN Radio affiliation in recent years, WBFX continues to air NASCAR Sprint Cup Series races, as it has for over a decade.

On July 6, 2015, WBFX tweaked its format towards an active rock-leaning mainstream rock presentation. While titles going back to the 1960s were occasionally played, the emphasis was strongly on rock music of the 1990s and 2000s.

The ratings slid a few months after this tweak in the format took place. On February 16, 2016, WBFX shifted the format back to classic rock, with emphasis on 1970s and 1980s rock music. The station also changed the lineup of DJs to prefer locally-based hosts instead of syndicated ones.

On January 23, 2017, the station added Rover's Morning Glory, a hot talk show from Cleveland, during morning drive time. On March 21, 2019, the station tweaked the playlist once again, eliminating much of the pre-1980s rock music and adding many well-known 1990s rock songs.

=== Oldies ===
On October 23, 2020, at 5 a.m., after playing "Cumbersome" by Seven Mary Three, WBFX began stunting. It played a loop of the fight songs of Michigan State University, Florida State University, and "Anchors Aweigh", the fight song for the United States Naval Academy. At noon the following day, the stunt shifted to the broadcast of that day's Michigan State Spartans football season opener. The team lost to the Rutgers Scarlet Knights, 38-27.

Following the football game, the station debuted a 1960s and 1970s-focused oldies format as "101.3 Big FM", competing against Townsquare Media's classic hits station WFGR. The only oldies station in the market had been Grand Valley State University's non-commercial WGVU.

=== Classic Hits/Classic AC ===
On April 1, 2026, the station tweaked the format to classic hits, removing all pre-1970s songs, reducing the amount of remaining 1970s music, and adding more songs from the 1980s, 1990s and early 2000s.

== HD Radio ==
WBFX is licensed for HD Radio operations. It previously featured iHeartRadio's "Full Metal Jackie" programming on its HD2 digital subchannel. In the show, Jackie Kajzer interviews musical guests and plays hard-edged rock. As of late 2022, this broadcast was eliminated and only the primary HD1 subchannel remains.
