= WMAX =

WMAX may refer to:

- Wmax, a Cinemax channel.
- WMAX (AM), a radio station (1440 AM) licensed to Bay City, Michigan, United States
- WMAX-FM, a radio station (96.1 FM) licensed to Holland, Michigan, United States
- WRDG, a radio station (105.3 FM) licensed to Bowdon, Georgia, United States, which used the call sign WMAX-FM from February 2002 to September 2004
- WMGP, a radio station (98.1 FM) licensed to Hogansville, Georgia, United States, which used the call sign WMAX-FM from August 1999 to February 2002
- WSLI (AM), a radio station (1480 AM) licensed to Kentwood, Michigan, United States, which used the call sign WMAX from the 1950s until July 1992
