= WOOD-FM =

News/talk radio station in Muskegon, Michigan

Coordinates: 43.230°N 86.084°W

Simulcast of WOOD (AM), Grand Rapids
- Muskegon, Michigan; United States
- Broadcast area: Grand Rapids metropolitan area; West Michigan
- Frequency: 106.9 MHz (HD Radio)
- Branding: NewsRadio WOOD 1300 and 106.9 FM

Programming
- Format: News/talk
- Subchannels: HD2: WKBZ simulcast
- Affiliations: CBS News Radio; Fox News Radio; Compass Media Networks; Premiere Networks; Grand Rapids Griffins; Michigan IMG Sports Network; Michigan Radio Network

Ownership
- Owner: iHeartMedia, Inc.; (iHM Licenses, LLC)
- Sister stations: WKBZ; WMRR; WMUS; WSNX

History
- First air date: November 1962
- Former call signs: WMUS-FM (1962–1965); WFFM (1965–1970); WMUS-FM (1979–2005); WMUS (2005–2010)
- Call sign meaning: Furnwood Broadcasting; WOOD (AM) was funded originally by furniture manufacturers

Technical information
- Licensing authority: FCC
- Facility ID: 25086
- Class: B
- ERP: 50,000 watts
- HAAT: 146 meters (479 ft)

Links
- Public license information: Public file; LMS
- Webcast: Listen live (via iHeartRadio)
- Website: woodradio.iheart.com

WOOD-FM (106.9 MHz) is a commercial radio station licensed to Muskegon, Michigan, serving West Michigan and is owned by iHeartMedia, Inc. It simulcasts a news/talk radio format with sister station WOOD (1300 AM). The studios and offices are at 77 Monroe Center in Downtown Grand Rapids. Following a local weekday drive time show, "West Michigan's Morning News", the station carries nationally syndicated talk shows from Sean Hannity, Glenn Beck, Dave Ramsey, Joe Pags, The Clay Travis and Buck Sexton Show and Coast to Coast AM with George Noory. Most hours begin with an update from Fox News Radio.

WOOD-FM has an effective radiated power of 50,000 watts. Its transmitter is off South Hilton Park Road in Muskegon. WOOD-FM broadcasts using HD Radio technology. Its HD-2 digital subchannel carries programming from co-owned WKBZ (1090 AM).

== History ==
The station originally signed on as WMUS-FM in November 1947. It was originally on 100.5 on the FM dial. WMUS-FM was Muskegon's first FM station and came on the air just a few months after its AM sister, WMUS. By 1950, WMUS-FM had gone dark, but the station was revived in November 1962. It had moved to its current frequency of 106.9 MHz and a power of 2,850 watts, gradually increased to the current 50,000 watts over the years. WMUS-FM's original programming consisted of a simulcast of its AM sister station.

In 1965, WMUS changed format from middle of the road (MOR) to country music as "Top Gun Radio". Rather than continue to simulcast, WMUS-FM separated programming and adopted the new call sign WFFM. In a "storecast" arrangement with Hasper's, a local grocery-store chain, WFFM aired instrumental easy listening music in monaural sound, interspersed with promotional announcements about Hasper's.

The WMUS-FM call letters returned to 106.9 in 1970 and the station resumed its simulcast of the AM's country format. FM stereo broadcasting was added in 1975. WMUS-AM-FM was the main affiliate and flagship station for the Grand Valley State Laker football radio network. Eventually the AM and FM signals switched roles, with the 50,000-watt stereo FM signal becoming the primary station and AM 1090 becoming the simulcast.

The AM-FM simulcast ended in April 2001 when AM 1090 changed to a news/talk format. The AM station took the call sign WKBZ which once belonged to one of WMUS' biggest competitor stations.

At noon on January 5, 2011, WMUS-FM ended its country sound. It then switched to a news/talk format, simulcasting sister station WOOD (1300 AM). It turned off the stereo equipment and broadcasts in mono, better suited to a spoken word format. At the same time the WMUS calls and format were moved to 107.9 FM. It acts primarily to fill in gaps in the AM station's signal. Despite West Michigan's flat land (with near-perfect ground conductivity) WOOD had always been all but unlistenable in Muskegon, Holland and other areas west of Grand Rapids even after quadrupling its power to 20,000 watts in 2003.

== Signal ==
The station can be received across all of West Michigan and as far east as Alma, St. Johns, and Northwest Lansing, with reception also possible in Eastern Wisconsin across Lake Michigan, especially in Sheboygan and Ozaukee Counties. WOOD-FM's short-spaced allocation, lack of stereo limiting its coverage, and higher power means that the Brookfield-licensed WRXS has a much smaller coverage area than most Milwaukee stations due to the heritage of the 106.9 signal in Muskegon. WSAE 106.9 "Home FM" in Spring Arbor, Michigan, often overpowers the frequency across south-west lower Michigan.

On June 21, 2021, a lightning strike at the tower site caused a fire that destroyed the transmitter building, temporarily knocking WOOD-FM off the air.

== Programming ==
WOOD's program director Phil Tower leads an airstaff that includes an all-news morning program, West Michigan's Morning News with Steve Kelly, Bret Bakita, Lauren Smith, and Rick Albin. West Michigan Live follows with host Justin Barclay. The rest of the day is filled by: Glenn Beck, The Clay Travis and Buck Sexton Show, Sean Hannity, Dave Ramsey, Joe Pags and Coast to Coast AM with George Noory. Most of WOOD Radio's weekday lineup comes from iHeart's Premiere Networks.

Weekend programs and hosts include: "Leo Laporte: The Tech Guy", Gordon Deal, "The Weekend with Michael Brown", Bill Cunningham and "Jill On Money".

WOOD Radio's local newsroom provides local, regional and national news every day of the week, plus world and national news from Fox News Radio. It also utilizes reports and breaking news coverage through an ancillary affiliation with CBS News Radio.

By way of its parent, WOOD-FM is the Muskegon home of University of Michigan Wolverines football and basketball. It also carries Grand Rapids Griffins ice hockey, though some games are shifted to sister station WMAX-FM. By way of its parent, it had long carried Detroit Tigers baseball, but those games moved to less-powerful WFGR for the 2026 season.
