= WSRW-FM =

Adult Contemporary radio station in Grand Rapids, Michigan

Coordinates: 42.655°N 85.527°W

- Grand Rapids, Michigan; United States
- Broadcast area: Grand Rapids metropolitan area - West Michigan
- Frequency: 105.7 MHz (HD Radio)
- Branding: Star 105.7

Programming
- Format: Adult contemporary
- Affiliations: Premiere Networks

Ownership
- Owner: iHeartMedia; (iHM Licenses, LLC)
- Sister stations: WBCT, WBFX, WMAX-FM, WOOD, WSNX-FM, WTKG

History
- First air date: February 26, 1962 (as WOOD-FM)
- Former call signs: WOOD-FM (1962–2010)
- Call sign meaning: Star West Michigan

Technical information
- Licensing authority: FCC
- Facility ID: 73605
- Class: B
- ERP: 265,000 watts
- HAAT: 177 meters (581 ft)

Links
- Public license information: Public file; LMS
- Webcast: Listen Live
- Website: westmichiganstar.iheart.com

WSRW-FM (105.7 MHz "Star 105.7") is a commercial radio station in Grand Rapids, Michigan. It airs an adult contemporary radio format and is owned by iHeartMedia. The studios and offices are on Monroe Center Street in Downtown Grand Rapids. The transmitter is off Payne Lake Road in Middleville.

WSRW-FM broadcasts in the HD Radio format. Smooth Jazz formerly aired on its "HD2" subchannel.

== Superpower status ==
WSRW-FM is a Class B "superpower" station. Its effective radiated power (ERP) is 265,000 watts. Because the station first went on the air in 1962, that higher power is grandfathered. Today, the Federal Communications Commission does not license FM stations for more than 100,000 watts (in this section of Michigan, the maximum power is 50,000 watts). With its antenna height above average terrain (HAAT) of 177 meters (581 feet), WSRW-FM should be powered with only 35,000 watts.

With a good radio, WSRW-FM can be heard as far east as Fowlerville, Michigan, as far north as Big Rapids, Michigan, and as far south as LaGrange, Indiana. It has listeners in Kalamazoo, Muskegon and Lansing, and has been heard across Lake Michigan in Illinois and Wisconsin on rare occasions.

Grand Rapids is home to 2 other superpower FM stations, 93.7 WBCT and 104.1 WVGR. WBCT, a country music station also owned by iHeartMedia, runs at 320,000 watts, the highest for any FM station in North America. WVGR is an affiliate station of the Michigan Public radio network and operates at 96,000 watts.

== History ==
=== Beautiful music WOOD-FM ===
On February 26, 1962, the station signed on for the first time as WOOD-FM. It was the FM counterpart to Grand Rapid's leading station, AM 1300 WOOD. The stations were owned by Time-Life Broadcasting, a subsidiary of a major magazine and book publisher. WOOD-FM was separately programmed, airing a beautiful music format. The station played instrumental cover versions of popular songs as well as Broadway and Hollywood show tunes, with limited interruptions.

The easy listening format continued through the 1980s, although as time went on, more soft vocals were added to the playlist in an effort to attract younger listeners. By the mid-80s, the audience had gotten older, while advertisers usually seek younger demographics, so WOOD-FM ended the instrumentals, and became a soft adult contemporary outlet, calling itself "EZ 105.7."

=== Clear Channel ownership ===
Through the 1990s, the station's playlist was tweaked to become a brighter, more upbeat AC, which also meant dropping songs by "MOR" or "easy listening" artists such as Barbra Streisand, Barry Manilow, Dionne Warwick and The Carpenters. In 1996, WOOD-AM-FM were acquired by Clear Channel Communications, the forerunner to current owner iHeartMedia.

Under Clear Channel ownership, WOOD-FM began calling itself "Star 105.7" in 2001.

=== WSRW-FM ===
After nearly a decade of using the moniker "Star 105.7," the call sign was changed on November 15, 2010. The new call letters were chosen to reflect the "Star" name, WSRW-FM. The station is required to use the "-FM" suffix due to an AM station also having the WSRW call letters, a co-owned station in Hillsboro, Ohio. The WOOD-FM call letters were later assigned to FM 106.9 in Muskegon, which had become a simulcast of AM 1300 WOOD's talk radio format.

WSRW-FM picked up Delilah's syndicated love songs show (replacing its locally based "EZ Love Songs") after Delilah was dropped by competitor WLHT. Delilah is syndicated by Premiere Networks, a subsidiary of iHeartMedia, the owner of WSRW-FM.

former logo

By 2012, WSRW-FM was delisted from the Mediabase add board. Clear Channel changed its name to iHeartMedia in the fall of 2014. WSRW had aired Casey Kasem's American Top 40: The '80s on weekends for several years. It has since moved to classic hits station WFGR.

=== Christmas music ===
Like many AC stations around the country, "Star" plays all Christmas music for a month or more, leading to Christmas. The practice began in 2001 with the station's changeover from "EZ 105.7" to "Star." At the time, it was not common for AC stations to adopt all-Christmas formats so early in the year. WSRW-FM was not the first station to go all-Christmas, nor was it even the first station in Grand Rapids to do so. Competitor WTRV had already done continuous Christmas music through the holiday season for a number of years, and still does today.

In 2001, "Star" promoted its holiday songs as musical "comfort food" after the catastrophic events of September 11, and the station has gone all-Christmas every holiday season since. As with many stations that switch to Christmas music, WSRW-FM generally experiences an uptick in ratings during the holidays.

== Jingles ==
Since the launch of "Star" in 2001, WOOD-FM and WSRW use jingle packages designed for co-owned WLIT in Chicago. The jingles are produced by Reelworld. In 2004, the station broke away from the WLIT jingles and aired Reelworld's jingle package produced for another co-owned station, WNIC in Detroit. Since 2008, WSRW-FM has used ReelWorld One AC.

== HD Radio ==
WSRW-FM is licensed for HD Radio operations:

- HD1 is a digital simulcast of the analog signal (Star 105.7).
- HD2 had featured Broadcast Architecture's "Smooth Jazz Network" programming. As of 2022, the HD2 channel was discontinued.
