= WGVS =

WGVS may refer to:

- WGVS-FM, a radio station (95.3 FM) licensed to Whitehall, Michigan, simulcasting WGVU-FM
- WSMZ (AM), a radio station (850 AM) licensed to Muskegon, Michigan, which held the call sign WGVS from 1999 to 2022
