= Webberville Community Schools =

School district in Michigan

Address
- 309 East Grand River Avenue Webberville, Ingham County, Michigan, 48892; United States

District information
- Grades: PreKindergarten–12
- Superintendent: Andrew Smith
- Schools: 3
- Budget: $7,324,000 2022–2023 expenditures
- NCES District ID: 2635730

Students and staff
- Students: 446 (2024–2025)
- Teachers: 27.43 (on an FTE basis) (2024–2025)
- Staff: 57.6 FTE (2024–2025)
- Student–teacher ratio: 16.26 (2024–2025)
- District mascot: Spartans

Other information
- Website: www.webbervilleschools.org

Webberville Community Schools is a public school district in Ingham County, Michigan. It serves Webberville and parts of the townships of Leroy, Locke, and White Oak. It also serves parts of the townships of Conway and Handy in Livingston County.

== History ==
Webberville Community Schools was founded in 1876, although the town's first school was established in 1856. By 1897, the district had three teachers.

The first section of the current elementary school was built in 1912, and held all grades until the current high school was built in 1960.

Efforts to reorganize the district, which entailed merging it with small outlying districts that paid tuition for its students to attend Webberville High School, began in 1955. After voters defeated the issue several times, it was approved in 1957.

A crisis befell the high school in 1960, when the majority of the fifteen faculty members expressed concerns to the school board over curriculum, operation of the school, and pay (starting salary for teachers with a bachelors degree was $3,800, or about $43,000 in 2026 dollars). With little support from either the school board or the community, seven of the teachers quit. By 1962, the high school had eleven faculty members.

A middle school wing was added to the high school in 1968. Several improvements to district buildings came in 1990, due to a $3.8 million bond issue approved by voters in 1988. Additions included a new cafetorium at the high school and a 20-classroom expansion at the elementary school.

== Schools ==
Schools in Webberville Community Schools district share a campus in Webberville. The high school and middle school share a building.

Schools in Webberville Community Schools district
School	Address	Notes
Webberville High School	309 East Grand River Avenue, Webberville	Grades 9–12
Webberville Middle School	309 East Grand River Avenue, Webberville	Grades 6-8
Webberville Elementary	202 North Main Street, Webberville	Grades PreK-5
