= WMUS =

Radio station in Muskegon, Michigan

Coordinates: 43.277°N 86.335°W

- Muskegon, Michigan; United States
- Broadcast area: Muskegon, Michigan
- Frequency: 107.9 MHz
- Branding: 107 MUS The Moose

Programming
- Format: Country
- Affiliations: Premiere Networks

Ownership
- Owner: iHeartMedia, Inc.; (iHM Licenses, LLC)
- Sister stations: WKBZ; WMRR; WOOD-FM; WSNX

History
- First air date: February 1990
- Former call signs: WMHG-FM (1990–1993); WMHG (1993–1996); WSHZ (1996–2010)
- Call sign meaning: Muskegon; also phonetically sounds out "moose"

Technical information
- Licensing authority: FCC
- Facility ID: 70635
- Class: B1
- ERP: 15,000 watts
- HAAT: 128 meters (420 ft)

Links
- Public license information: Public file; LMS
- Webcast: Listen live (via iHeartRadio)
- Website: 107mus.iheart.com

WMUS (107.9 FM, "107 MUS") is a radio station broadcasting a country music format in Muskegon, Michigan. The station is owned by iHeartMedia, Inc.

== History ==
The station signed on in February 1990 as urban station WMHG-FM.

=== Magic 108 ===
Acknowledging the need for an urban oriented radio station in west Michigan, in 1993 WMHG evolved into "Magic 108", playing urban contemporary music. The station at this time was owned by Goodrich Radio. WMHG upgraded its signal to 15,000 watts and would reach as far as Grand Rapids and south towards Kalamazoo County. Some D.J.s at "Magic 108" i.e. [D.J. M] who would later work at sister WSNX had local mix shows in attempts to bring strong ratings to 'Magic 108". WMHG would become West Michigan's first and only FM R&B radio station which could be heard from North of Muskegon to Near Kalamazoo. In recent years, WVIB and WUVS-LP, both FM stations, have filled the hole for urban radio in the Muskegon market.

=== Z108 ===
In 1996, Goodrich would move WMHG's calls and format to 1600 AM as "Magic 1600" (which later moved to Grand Rapids as WJNZ 1680AM Jamz, while 1600 AM continued for several years afterward with an adult standards format), and 107.9 FM would become WSHZ ("Z108"), with a satellite-fed hot AC format.

In October 1999, "Z108," was sold from Goodrich Radio to Connoisseur Communications who began dropping hints that a change was coming to the station. Some interpreted the hints to mean that WSHZ would change to a CHR format to challenge former sister station WSNX, particularly when it was learned that Britta Cleveland would be part of the new local air staff. Instead, WSHZ transitioned from hot AC to mainstream AC as "Star 108", with a mostly local air staff.

Star 108 was Muskegon's affiliate station for Delilah's nighttime love-songs program, syndicated by Clear Channel's Premiere Radio Networks, which also distributed Whoopi Goldberg's morning show (also heard on Star 108).

Like many other AC stations, WSHZ played continuous Christmas music during most of the months of November and December.

On December 10, 2010, WSHZ changed their format to country, simulcasting WMUS (106.9 FM). On January 5, 2011, the simulcast ended and 107.9 became the new home for WMUS, while 106.9 FM became a full-time simulcast of Grand Rapids' WOOD.

== HD Radio ==
WMUS broadcasts in HD Radio and as of October 2015 aired a rebroadcast of the iHeartRadio feed featuring pop-R&B singer Jason Derulo as guest DJ. In June 2016, WMUS-HD2 went from classic country to iHeart80s. After origination for the iHeart80s feed was transferred to the HD2 of New York sister station WLTW, WMUS-HD2 began carrying Halloween Radio.

== Former 107.9 personalities ==
=== Magic 108 Jamz ===
- D.J M Weekend Magic Mix (Magic 108)
