= WBCT =

Country music radio station in Grand Rapids, Michigan

Coordinates: 42.632°N 85.538°W

- Grand Rapids, Michigan; United States
- Broadcast area: Grand Rapids-Kalamazoo
- Frequency: 93.7 MHz (HD Radio)
- Branding: B-93

Programming
- Format: Country

Ownership
- Owner: iHeartMedia, Inc.; (iHM Licenses, LLC)
- Sister stations: WBFX; WMAX-FM; WOOD; WSNX-FM; WSRW-FM; WTKG

History
- First air date: October 1951
- Former call signs: WJEF-FM (1951–1963); WJFM (1963–1992)

Technical information
- Licensing authority: FCC
- Facility ID: 73606
- Class: B
- ERP: 320,000 watts
- HAAT: 238 meters (781 ft)

Links
- Public license information: Public file; LMS
- Webcast: Listen live (via iHeartRadio)
- Website: b93.iheart.com

WBCT (93.7 FM, "B-93") is a commercial radio station licensed to Grand Rapids, Michigan, and owned by iHeartMedia. The studios and offices are located at 77 Monroe Center in Downtown Grand Rapids. The station has had a country music radio format since July 24, 1992.

WBCT's transmitter is located on the tower of former sister television station WWMT in Yankee Springs Township near Gun Lake. WBCT has the distinction of broadcasting with the highest power of any North American radio station, at 320,000 watts effective radiated power (ERP). The antenna is approximately 800 feet (240 m) up the 1,100-foot (340 m) structure. The station provides at least secondary coverage to 20 counties in Michigan, spanning 25,000 square miles (65,000 km^{2}). Under the right conditions, its signal can be heard as far east as Howell, Michigan, as far south as Rome City, Indiana, as far north as Reed City, Michigan, and as far west as Milwaukee, Wisconsin, WBCT is a Class B "Superpower Grandfathered" station, meaning its power was granted before the Federal Communications Commission set maximum standards for FM radio stations. The maximum ERP that would be granted today, under FCC rules, using the same antenna height of 238 meters, would be 20,000 watts. Grand Rapids has two other superpower grandfathered stations, 105.7 WSRW-FM at 265,000 watts and 104.1 WVGR at 96,000 watts.

WBCT is licensed for HD Radio operation, and carries The Nashville Channel on its HD2 subchannel.

== History ==
=== WJEF-FM/The Modern Sound ===
The station began operations in October 1951 as WJEF-FM, simulcasting sister station WJEF (1230 AM, now WTKG). In 1960, WJEF-FM broke away from the simulcast and began playing classical music. That year, the station increased its power to 500,000 watts. This was under the ownership of John Fetzer, who also previously owned WKZO-TV (now WWMT), WWTV-FM (now WJZQ) in Cadillac, and the Detroit Tigers baseball team. WJEF also owned and operated a Muzak franchise it broadcast on a sub-carrier.

In the mid-1960s, the station, then known as WJFM, switched to a MOR/news/talk/sports format, and in 1967 became more music-intensive, adopting the moniker "The Modern Sound," which Fetzer reportedly soon did away with because he felt the station played too much "rock and roll." From that point and through much of the 1970s, apart from an automated country format in 1971–1972, WJFM was primarily a beautiful music station. Despite its strong signal, the station usually hovered near the bottom of the ratings during this time.

=== Mellow 93/Joy FM/Classic Rock ===
WJFM changed to an automated Top 40 format in 1977, and then adult contemporary music the following year as "Mellow 93", picking up the format that had been abandoned by WMLW in its switch to WFFX earlier that year. "Mellow 93" proved a moderate ratings success, with the station usually around fifth or sixth place.

The AC format lasted until the station called in a consultant, who attempted a format change to Top 40/CHR in 1984. The change on the airwaves not only included the music selection, with most of the staff either quitting or being let go. With the Grand Rapids area flooded with CHR stations at the time, as WGRD, WSNX and WKLQ were all playing Top 40 music, WJFM's CHR format lasted only two years before the station went back to Soft AC as "The New Joy FM." The "Joy" format also proved a failure, and in 1988, WJFM became a classic hits station. Ratings for the classic hits format were initially very good but soon dropped off, and in 1990, the station evolved to classic rock.

=== B-93 ===
Fetzer died in 1991, and his family sold the station a year later. In June 1992, Billboard magazine reported that a number of key WJFM staffers, including general manager Joel Schaaf, program director and midday host Sean Stevens, and morning man Jeff France, had left the station, and rumors began swirling to the effect that the classic rock station would go country to take on incumbent country powerhouse WCUZ. Sure enough, on July 24, 1992, the classic rock format was dropped for country, and WJFM became WBCT as "B93". B-93 has ranked number one or number two 12+ ever since. Lee Cory was the original program director, and Neal Dionne and Reese Rickards were the original B-93 morning show hosts. They worked mornings for 22 years before having their jobs eliminated in a round of budget cuts initiated by current owner, iHeartMedia.
