= WLGH =

- Leroy Township, Michigan; United States
- Broadcast area: Lansing–East Lansing metropolitan area
- Frequency: 88.1 MHz
- Branding: Smile FM

Programming
- Format: Contemporary Christian
- Network: Smile FM

Ownership
- Owner: Superior Communications

History
- First air date: November 25, 1996
- Call sign meaning: "Light"

Technical information
- Licensing authority: FCC
- Facility ID: 78460
- Class: B1
- ERP: 6,700 watts
- HAAT: 174 meters (571 ft)
- Transmitter coordinates: 42°42′20″N 84°21′27″W

Links
- Public license information: Public file; LMS
- Webcast: Listen live
- Website: smile.fm

WLGH (88.1 FM) is a non-commercial radio station licensed to Leroy Township, Michigan, United States, serving the Lansing, Michigan metro area. Owned by Superior Communications, (aka Michigan Community Radio and Northland Community Broadcasters) it carries a contemporary Christian format as the flagship of Smile FM. WLGH's studios and transmitter are both located in Williamston, Michigan.

WLGH began broadcasting in December 1996 as "The Light". In June 2004 it "married" its sister station, "Joy FM", in a ceremony at Oldsmobile Park in Lansing. The new network became known as Smile FM with WLGH as the flagship station. All programming for the 13 stations in the Smile FM network originates at WLGH.

The station originally broadcast with 2.5 kW from 328 ft (100 m), but increased its power to 6.7 kW from a 571 ft (174 m) tower in 2006. This improved coverage, especially to the north and south of Lansing.

== Translators ==
W242BH began rebroadcasting WLGH in January 2018 to improve reception in the Marshall/Battle Creek area.

Call sign	Frequency	City of license	FID	ERP (W)	HAAT	Class	FCC info
W242BH	96.3 FM	Marshall, Michigan	145241	120	30 m (98 ft)	D	LMS
