= WSIS =

WSIS may refer to:

- WSIS (FM), a radio station (88.7 FM) licensed to Riverside, Michigan, United States
- World Summit on the Information Society
