= Scott Winters =

Scott Winters may refer to:

- Scott Winters (radio personality)
- Scott William Winters, American actor
