= WMHG =

Radio station in Muskegon, Michigan (1949–2008)

Muskegon, Michigan; United States
- Frequency: 1600 kHz
- Branding: Unforgettable Magic

Programming
- Format: Adult standards

Ownership
- Owner: Cumulus Media; (Cumulus Licensing LLC)
- Operator: Clear Channel Communications

History
- First air date: 1949
- Last air date: January 1, 2008
- Former call signs: WKNK (1948–1957); WTRU (1957–1989); WSNX (1989–1992); WSFN (1992–1996)
- Call sign meaning: Muskegon Heights

Technical information
- Facility ID: 24643
- Class: B
- Power: 5,000 watts

WMHG (1600 AM, "Unforgettable Magic") was a radio station in Muskegon, Michigan. It broadcast a MOR/oldies format. WMHG used ABC Radio Networks' satellite-delivered "Timeless Favorites" (formerly known as "Stardust") format.

The station was deleted in 2008 after the Federal Communications Commission determined that its license had been improperly transferred in 1999.

== History ==
WMHG was first licensed in 1949 as WKNK (which stood for the original owner of the station, Nick Kurtis) in Muskegon, with 1,000 watts daytime-only on 1600 kHz. The call letters were changed to WTRU on April 13, 1957, airing a Top 40 music format that would become legendary in the history of West Michigan radio and dominated the Muskegon market through the mid-1970s.

During the station's later years, one of the DJs, Larry Allen, hosted an FM-like program called "Spectrum" on late Saturday nights. Allen (who died in December 2013), later hosted a Saturday night deep-track show on WMMQ in Lansing, Michigan. The station's influence and popularity waned with the waxing of FM radio in the late 1970s—by the end of the 1970s, however, as rock music continued its shift from AM to FM, WTRU had shifted to a full-service adult contemporary format.

The Top 40/CHR format returned to 1600 AM in 1986 as WTRU began to simulcast "Sunny" 104.5 WSNX-FM, taking the WSNX calls in 1989 to go along with the simulcast. This continued through 1992, when the station became sports-talk WSFN "The Fan". In 1996, WMHG was on 107.9 as "Magic 108", which at the time was West Michigan's only FM R&B and urban station, and was owned by Goodrich Radio. However, due to the fall in ratings Goodrich decided to keep the urban format and moved the WMHG calls to 1600 AM, which adopted the urban contemporary format, on November 18, 1996.

=== Expanded Band assignment ===
On March 17, 1997, the Federal Communications Commission (FCC) announced that eighty-eight stations had been given permission to move to newly available "Expanded Band" transmitting frequencies, ranging from 1610 to 1700 kHz, with WMHG authorized to move from 1600 kHz to 1680 kHz.

A construction permit for the expanded band station was assigned the call letters WBHD (now WPRR) on September 4, 1998. The FCC's initial policy was that both the original station and its expanded band counterpart could operate simultaneously for up to five years, after which owners would have to turn in one of the two licenses, depending on whether they preferred the new assignment or elected to remain on the original frequency. However, this deadline was extended multiple times, and both stations remained authorized after the initial five year period.

=== Later history ===
In the fall of 1998 the programming on 1600 AM was replaced by ABC's Stardust format. The urban format originally on 1600 AM was moved to the expanded band station at 1680 AM, which switched from "Magic" to WJNZ "1680 Jamz". The "Stardust" format was renamed to "Timeless Favorites" in 2007, by which time the music rotation had moved away from traditional adult standards to soft Top 40 oldies chiefly of the 1960s and 1970s.

=== Invalid license assignment and resulting deletion ===
In August 1999, the FCC inadvertently approved assignment of WMHG's license from Goodrich to Connoisseur Communications of Muskegon, L.P., even though Goodrich retained ownership of then-WDSS (now WPRR) on 1680 AM. This was in error, because FCC policy generally required original stations and their expanded band counterparts to remain under common ownership. Connoisseur subsequently sold WMHG to Cumulus Licensing, LLC, which was granted on March 15, 2000. Although owned by Cumulus Media, WMHG was operated by Clear Channel Communications via a Local Marketing Agreement (LMA).

Later in 2000, Goodrich filed a request for a nunc pro tunc waiver to retroactively excuse its breach of the common ownership rule and allow Goodrich to continue owning and operating the 1680 AM expanded band station separately from its standard band companion, while Cumulus applied for approval to assign WMHG to Clear Channel Communications, Inc. This was not approved, and Cumulus agreed to surrender WMHG's license and dismiss its application to assign the station to Clear Channel.

On January 1, 2008, WMHG went dark permanently, handed in its broadcast license to the FCC on February 29, 2008, and was deleted from the FCC database on March 3, 2008.
