= Scott Winters (radio personality) =

American radio show host

Richard Scott Winters (born March 31, 1963) is an American radio disc jockey and former talk show host.

Winters is a 1981 graduate of Union High School in Grand Rapids, Michigan. After graduating high school, he began working in the commercial printing industry. He stayed in that business for 12 years. In 1989, Winters began to work part-time at WKLQ in Grand Rapids as a disc jockey and as the producer of the nighttime version of the Q Zoo. In 1993, he replaced Jay Allen in the popular Q Morning Zoo, alongside Rick Beckett and Darla Jaye.

On September 12, 1995, Beckett, Jaye, and Winters resigned from KLQ to work for cross-town rival WGRD. On September 25, 1995, all three signed on to GRD for their first show. In October 2002, he was fired from GRD just weeks after Beckett was fired. From 1997-99, he served as announcer/co-host for all 100 episodes of the short-lived but official state lottery game show NY Wired, which put an emphasis on computer labs for schools. In April 2003, Winters and Beckett signed on to WOOD-AM to begin the talk show phase of their careers. The Rick and Scott Show quickly became one of the top-rated shows in Grand Rapids radio, eventually winning a Michigan Association of Broadcasters award for Midday Show Broadcast Team of the Year. He and Beckett were on-air partners for 15 ½ years until Beckett’s death on February 26, 2009. He was eventually paired with radio veteran Michelle McKormick and the show was renamed Mouth 2 Mouth.

On November 5, 2010 Scott Winters and Michelle McKormick were let go by WOOD-AM and replaced by the nationally syndicated show Glenn Beck. From June to September 2011, Winters worked at WGLM in Greenville, Michigan as an account executive. In September 2011, Winters was hired by WOOD-TV as a digital sales consultant. Winters left WOOD TV in December 2014.

He is currently a licensed realtor working for Berkshire Hathaway Home Services. In addition to real estate he and a friend own and run a website development and media company called Winrock Media.

Winters can also be heard on Greatest Hits 98.7 WFGR in Grand Rapids weekdays from 3-7 pm and weekends from 10 am-3 pm.
