= WKBZ =

Radio station in Muskegon, Michigan

Coordinates: 43°16′36.1″N 86°15′14.2″W

- Muskegon, Michigan; United States
- Frequency: 1090 kHz
- Branding: NewsTalk 1090

Programming
- Format: News/talk
- Affiliations: Fox News Radio; Compass Media Networks; Premiere Networks

Ownership
- Owner: iHeartMedia, Inc.; (iHM Licenses, LLC)
- Sister stations: WMRR; WOOD-FM; WMUS

History
- First air date: 1947
- Former call signs: WMUS (1947–2005)
- Call sign meaning: Former call letters of two Muskegon stations, 850 and 1520 AM

Technical information
- Licensing authority: FCC
- Facility ID: 25087
- Class: D
- Power: 1,000 watts day

Links
- Public license information: Public file; LMS
- Webcast: Listen live (via iHeartRadio)
- Website: newstalk1090.iheart.com

WKBZ (1090 AM) is a news/talk radio station in Muskegon, Michigan owned by iHeartMedia, Inc.

== History ==
The current WKBZ is the former WMUS. WMUS began operations in 1947 and became the second radio station serving Muskegon, after the original WKBZ (today's WSMZ); it began as a general-interest independent variety station featuring Associated Press newscasts. WMUS also inaugurated the first FM broadcasts in Muskegon in the summer of 1947, just a few months after the AM signed on, with WMUS-FM at 100.5; the FM station was dark by the start of the 1950s but came back on at its current frequency in 1962.

WMUS moved into a MOR/beautiful music format in the early 1960s, promoting itself as "the AM station with the FM sound" (1). Then in 1965, WMUS changed format to country music using the moniker "Top Gun Radio". A few years later WMUS-FM 106.9 began to simulcast WMUS's country format, and eventually the roles were reversed, with WMUS-FM becoming the primary signal and WMUS becoming the simulcast. This continued until April 2001, when both stations were sold to Clear Channel Communications. The AM facility adopted a news/talk format, while the FM facility remained unchanged. In April 2005, the call sign of WMUS was changed to WKBZ, marking the return of the call letters to the radio market after 4 years of absence. (They had been on the 850 frequency, now WSMZ, from 1926 to 1999, and on 1520 kHz from 1999 to 2001.)
