= The Free Beer and Hot Wings Show =

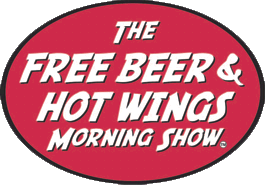
- Country of origin: United States
- Home station: WGRD-FM (Grand Rapids)
- Syndicates: Compass Media Networks
- Hosted by: Gregg "Free Beer" Daniels; Chris "Hot Wings" Michels
- Produced by: Steve McKiernan; Kelly Cheesborough; Maitlynn Mossolle
- Website: www.freebeerandhotwings.com

The Free Beer and Hot Wings Show is a syndicated morning talk radio show broadcast primarily from the Townsquare Media radio station WGRD-FM in Grand Rapids, Michigan. The show is hosted by Gregg "Free Beer" Daniels, Chris "Hot Wings" Michels, executive producer Steve McKiernan, producer Kelly Cheesborough and Maitlynn Mossolle. Phone-screener, Tommy McNeil joined the team in January 2024. The show is syndicated throughout America, and is distributed by Compass Media Networks.

The Free Beer and Hot Wings Show has also guest hosted The Dan Patrick Show on multiple occasions.

Former Members	Role	Start	End
Eric Zane	Host		2/17/2016
Producer Justin	Producer		11/16/2018
Joe Gasmann	Host		11/16/2022

== Holiday Break-in ==
Every December, the show solicits the nomination by their listeners of needy families to be the recipients of the Holiday Break-in for those unable to buy holiday gifts. Once the recipients are selected, participating radio affiliates break into the houses of these families (with the assistance of the nominator, a locksmith, and local police) and bring the holidays where there would be none.

== Awards ==
The Free Beer and Hot Wings Show won the Michigan Association of Broadcasters award in 2005 2006, and 2007.

Free Beer and Hot Wings won the RadioContraband Rock Radio Award for "Syndicated Morning Show of the Year" in 2013 and 2014

The Free Beer and Hot Wings Show was a nominee for the 2024 induction class of the Radio Hall of Fame.

== Controversies ==
In early 2018, producer Joseph "Joe" Gassmann was arrested in Naperville, Illinois, in DuPage county, for two counts of domestic battery, which are Class A misdemeanors in Illinois. Townsquare Media released a statement:

"As you may be aware, Joe Gassmann of The Free Beer and Hot Wings show was arrested after a domestic altercation this past Saturday night. Joe has been suspended and will not be appearing on the show, pending resolution of the police investigation of the matter." The charges were eventually dropped and Joe returned to the show near the end of May 2018.
