= Smile FM =

Contemporary Christian music radio network in Michigan

Programming
- Format: Religious; Contemporary Christian

Ownership
- Owner: Superior Communications

History
- Founded: 1996

Links
- Webcast: www.smile.fm/streaming/
- Website: www.smile.fm

Smile FM is a network of non-commercial, contemporary Christian radio stations in the state of Michigan owned by Superior Communications, a nonprofit organization. Most programming originates from studios in Williamston (just east of Lansing) and is relayed (with local inserts) by an expanding number of stations throughout the state. The network also has studios in Imlay City, Michigan.

Smile FM was originally two separate networks. The first, The Light, was founded in December 1996, when WLGH in Leroy Township, serving Lansing, signed on. The second, Joy FM, began on December 12, 2000, with WHYT (renamed as WWKM and again as WDTR) in Imlay City. While both played contemporary Christian music, The Light aimed for a younger audience. In June 2004, the two networks were combined to form Smile FM in a "wedding ceremony" conducted at Oldsmobile Park in Lansing. The new name eliminated confusion since many other unrelated stations used The Light and Joy FM names.

The network is notable for putting stations on the air at a low cost. They lease existing towers and manufacture some of their own equipment. Unlike many Christian stations, they play music with only a few short breaks for weather, news, announcements, and features. Smile FM has also pioneered the use of new technology to help distribute and customize its programming, including developing an emergency weather notification system that is faster and more reliable than the required EAS system (which they also operate).

The licenses for the stations are split between four subsidiaries: Superior Communications, Michigan Community Radio, Northland Community Broadcasters and Smile FM.

In January 2008, Smile FM established WWKM (now WDTR) Imlay City as the flagship of an experimental Smile FM Praise network playing Christian contemporary worship music. Previously, the station had broadcast traditional Christian music and hymns. The Smile FM Praise experiment was ended in 2009 and plans made to move that station to the northern suburbs of Detroit.

The owners have often recycled the call letters of famous Michigan stations of the past for their stations. WDTR (now WRCJ), WHYT (now WDVD), and WVMV (now WDZH) were once used by Detroit stations. WTAC (now WSNL) was the leading top 40 station in Flint during the 1960s (and, ironically, a pioneering contemporary Christian station during the 1980s). WKPK was used by a popular top 40 station of the 1980s and 1990s in northern Michigan (now WSRT). WAIR was an oldies station in northern Michigan (now WFDX) and the calls were also used for a construction permit for a station in Honor (now WSRJ). WWKM was a now-defunct station in Harrison (and Smile FM's 88.5 FM station in the Alpena area, WSFP, once bore the calls of WWKM's sister station WKKM, which is now WTWS in Houghton Lake).

Others were named for the original formats of the stations. WLGH and WTLI were The Light. All of the stations beginning with WJ were in or scheduled to be in the Joy FM network. All call letters beginning with WDT (WDTE, WDTP, and WDTR) serve portions of the Detroit metropolitan area.

== Smile FM Network Stations ==
The combined footprint of Smile FM's stations covers most of Michigan's densely populated area (though much of West Michigan relies on translators).

Stations owned and operated by Smile FM include:

Call sign	Frequency	City of license	FID	ERP (W)	HAAT	Class	FCC info
KOYH	95.5 FM	Elaine, Arkansas	190430	6,000	85 m (279 ft)	A	LMS
WLGH	88.1 FM	Leroy Township, Ingham County, Michigan	78460	6,700	174 m (571 ft)	B1	LMS
WSMF	88.1 FM	Monroe, Michigan	89277	1,200	41 m (135 ft)	A	LMS
WHYT	88.1 FM	Goodland Township, Michigan	84187	400	177 m (581 ft)	A	LMS
WEJC	88.3 FM	White Star, Michigan	64021	55,000	114 m (374 ft)	C1	LMS
WKPK	88.3 FM	Michigamme, Michigan	92241	15,000	252 m (827 ft)	C2	LMS
WSMZ-FM	88.3 FM	Crystal Valley, Michigan	175566	1,500	200 m (656 ft)	A	LMS
WDTE	88.3 FM	Grosse Pointe Shores, Michigan	175093	5,500	50 m (164 ft)	A	LMS
WJOM	88.5 FM	Eagle, Michigan	121794	4,300 (Note: WJOM currently holds a construction permit to increase to 25,000 watts.)	40 m (131 ft)	A	LMS
WSIS	88.7 FM	Riverside, Michigan	741647	6,000	117 m (384 ft)	B1	LMS
WDTR	88.9 FM	Imlay City, Michigan	92635	3,200	61 m (200 ft)	A	LMS
WTLI	89.3 FM	Bear Creek Township, Michigan	84479	50,000	312 m (1,024 ft)	C1	LMS
WSMB	89.3 FM	Harbor Beach, Michigan	175249	12,000	145 m (476 ft)	C3	LMS
WDTP	89.5 FM	Huron Charter Township, Michigan	176302	700	95 m (312 ft)	A	LMS
WJOJ	89.7 FM	Rust Township, Michigan	88667	31,000	143 m (469 ft)	C2	LMS
WTAC	89.7 FM	Burton, Michigan	88040	15,000	110 m (361 ft)	B1	LMS
WSLI-FM	90.9 FM	Belding, Michigan	91446	11,500	73 m (240 ft)	B1	LMS
WJOG	91.3 FM	Good Hart, Michigan	121776	6,000	209.2 m (686 ft)	C2	LMS
WVMV	91.5 FM	China Township, Michigan	176215	1,050	75 m (246 ft)	A	LMS
WAIR	104.9 FM	Lake City, Michigan	92345	2,800	149 m (489 ft)	A	LMS
WJOH	91.5 FM	Raco, Michigan	121795	5,500	100 m (328 ft)	A	LMS
WYOR	88.5 FM	Republic, Ohio	174213	100	32 m (105 ft)	A	LMS

=== Translators ===
Translators rebroadcasting Smile FM include:

Call sign	Frequency	City of license	FID	ERP (W)	HAAT	Class	FCC info	Notes
W242BH	96.3 FM	Marshall, Michigan	145241	170	32.1 m (105 ft)	D	LMS	repeats WLGH; serves Battle Creek
W246CW	97.1 FM	Long Lake Township, Michigan	158283	10	260.8 m (856 ft)	D	LMS	repeats WTLI; serves Traverse City
W247CU	97.3 FM	Fort Gratiot, Michigan	157054	25	83 m (272 ft)	D	LMS	repeats WVMV; serves Port Huron
W262AF	100.3 FM	Parchment, Michigan	78387	38	52.5 m (172 ft)	D	LMS	repeats WSIS; serves Kalamazoo
W273CI	102.5 FM	Grand Haven, Michigan	148894	250	191 m (627 ft)	D	LMS	repeats WSMZ-FM; serves Muskegon
W280EL	103.9 FM	Yates, Michigan	156357	10	119.3 m (391 ft)	D	LMS	repeats WVMV; serves northern Metro Detroit suburbs
W286CI	105.1 FM	Saginaw, Michigan	143161	250	49 m (161 ft)	D	LMS	repeats WEJC
W299CB	107.7 FM	Manistee, Michigan	153183	19	98 m (322 ft)	D	LMS	repeats WSMZ-FM
W272DG	102.3 FM	Pittsfield Township, Michigan	157119	19	98 m (322 ft)	D	LMS	repeats WTAC; serves Ann Arbor
W244EN	96.7 FM	Lapeer, Michigan	157076	250	276.5 m (907 ft)	D	LMS	repeats WTAC; serves Flint
W260CQ	99.9 FM	Plainfield Township, Kent County, Michigan	158538	10	126 m (413 ft)	D	LMS	repeats WSLI-FM; serves Grand Rapids
WLHT	95.7 FM	Grand Rapids, Michigan	37457	40,000	147 m (482 ft)	B	LMS	uses HD2 subchannel, repeats WSLI-FM

As of 2026, Smile FM has expanded coverage beyond Michigan, with at least one signal in the following states: Ohio (WYOR), Arkansas (KOYR), Florida (WKFA-FM), Kansas (KSNS), Mississippi (KOYH, licensed Elaine Arkansas), and Tennessee (WOWE).

== Future stations ==
On October 6, 2022, it was announced that Smile FM has filed a $60,000 deal to purchase WGVU (1480 AM) in Grand Rapids from Grand Valley State University. The station, along with WGVS (850 AM) in Muskegon, originally carried an oldies radio format until January 7, 2022, when both stations closed down. Smile FM had already acquired WGVS effective June 28, 2022, for $25,000.
