= WOOD (AM) =

Coordinates: 42°45′22″N 85°39′24″W

- Grand Rapids, Michigan; United States
- Broadcast area: Grand Rapids metropolitan area; West Michigan
- Frequency: 1300 kHz
- Branding: NewsRadio WOOD 1300 and 106.9 FM

Programming
- Format: News/talk
- Affiliations: CBS News Radio; Fox News Radio; Compass Media Networks; Premiere Networks; Grand Rapids Griffins; Michigan IMG Sports Network; Michigan Radio Network

Ownership
- Owner: iHeartMedia, Inc.; (iHM Licenses, LLC)
- Sister stations: WBCT; WBFX; WMAX-FM; WSNX-FM; WSRW-FM; WTKG

History
- First air date: September 16, 1924
- Former call signs: WEBK (1924–1926)
- Call sign meaning: Furnwood Broadcasting; station funded originally by furniture manufacturers

Technical information
- Licensing authority: FCC
- Facility ID: 73604
- Class: B
- Power: 20,000 watts
- Repeater: 106.9 WOOD-FM (Muskegon)

Links
- Public license information: Public file; LMS
- Webcast: Listen live (via iHeartRadio)
- Website: woodradio.iheart.com

WOOD (1300 kHz) is a commercial AM radio station in Grand Rapids, Michigan, serving West Michigan and owned by iHeartMedia, Inc. It has a news/talk radio format and is simulcast on co-owned WOOD-FM in Muskegon at 106.9 MHz. The studios and offices are at 77 Monroe Center in Downtown Grand Rapids. Following a local weekday drive time show, "West Michigan's Morning News", the station carries nationally syndicated talk shows from Sean Hannity, Glenn Beck, Dave Ramsey, Joe Pags, The Clay Travis and Buck Sexton Show and Coast to Coast AM with George Noory. Most hours begin with an update from Fox News Radio.

WOOD is powered at 20,000 watts. To protect other stations on 1300 AM from interference, it uses a directional antenna with a four-tower array. The transmitter is on 146th Avenue SE in Moline.

== History ==
=== Early years ===
WOOD is the oldest radio station in West Michigan. Its sign-on date, as WEBK, was September 16, 1924, and it was a marketing tool for the C.J. Litscher Company, a seller of radio receivers. The station's original owners were backed by the Furniture Manufacturers Association of Grand Rapids. At their suggestion, the station's original call sign, which was randomly assigned from a sequential roster of available call letters, became WOOD on January 13, 1926, since wood is required for crafting furniture.

It broadcast on Sundays and Wednesdays at 1170 kHz during its early years in order to avoid interference with stations in Chicago, Detroit and Cleveland, all of which could easily be heard in West Michigan.

It went through numerous owners over the years before being bought by John King (known as John Kunsky until 1936) and George Trendle, owners of WXYZ in Detroit, in 1930. They bought Grand Rapids' second radio station, WASH, a year later; the two stations had shared the same frequency for four years. The station operated as WOOD-WASH (with WASH on the air during the day and WOOD at night) until 1942, when the WASH license was dropped. At about the same time, WOOD's broadcast power was increased from 500 watts to 5,000 watts.

WOOD was an affiliate of the NBC Red Network. It carried NBC's schedule of dramas, comedies, news, sports, game shows, soap operas and big band broadcasts during the "Golden Age of Radio".

=== Changes in ownership ===
In 1946, the fledgling American Broadcasting Company (ABC) bought the King-Trendle stations, but the Federal Communications Commission (FCC) forced ABC to sell WOOD since it had been an NBC affiliate since 1935. After a two-year dispute between competing buyers, the station was finally sold to Harry Bitner, former general manager of the Hearst newspaper chain, in 1948.

Since 1951, the station's mascot has been Willie Wood, a cartoon woodpecker, tying in with the station's call letters. Also in 1951, a subsidiary of Bitner's company acquired Channel 8 for $1.37 million. That station had been called WLAV-TV but switched its call sign to WOOD-TV. In February 1962, an FM station was also added, 105.7 WOOD-FM. For the first few years, it simulcast WOOD 1300 but later took on a beautiful music format and today is adult contemporary WSRW-FM, known as West Michigan Star 105.7.

Time Inc. bought WOOD-AM-FM-TV in 1957 and owned it until 1972. As network programming moved from radio to television in the 1950s and 60s, WOOD began a full service, middle of the road format of popular adult music, talk, news and sports. In the 1980s, the talk programming increased and music was reduced, as most music listening switched from AM radio to the FM dial. By the 1990s, the station had evolved into a full time News/Talk format.

=== iHeart ownership ===
former logo

Clear Channel Communications bought WOOD and its sister stations in 1996.

Since the 1940s, WOOD had transmitted from a three-tower site on 60th Street in Dorr Township at 5,000 watts. A single tower was used during the day, while power was fed to all three towers in a directional pattern at night. However, by the turn of the millennium, due to growing residential development and signal issues, WOOD moved to a new site seven miles south, boosting its power to 20,000 watts in a directional pattern at all times.

In 2011, Clear Channel's WMUS-FM and its country music format moved to 107.9 FM. Meanwhile, 106.9 FM flipped to a simulcast of WOOD, allowing its listeners to hear the station either on AM or FM. Despite the AM station's power and West Michigan's mostly flat landscape (with near-perfect ground conductivity), it had always been all but unlistenable in Muskegon, Holland and other areas west of Grand Rapids even after the 2003 power boost.

Clear Channel switched its name to iHeartMedia in 2014. WOOD-AM-FM can be heard on the iHeartRadio platform and app.

WOOD Radio has received "Station of the Year" honors from the Michigan Association of Broadcasters for 2012, 2013, 2015, and 2016, as part of the Broadcast Excellence Awards in the Commercial Radio - Market 2 division. In earning "2012 Station of the Year", WOOD received numerous news and programming awards, with five entries receiving 'Best In Category' recognition, and three receiving 'Merit' recognition.

== Programming ==
WOOD's program director Phil Tower leads an airstaff that includes an all-news morning program, West Michigan's Morning News with Steve Kelly, Bret Bakita, and Lauren Smith. West Michigan Live follows with host Justin Barclay. The rest of the day is filled by: Glenn Beck, The Clay Travis and Buck Sexton Show, Sean Hannity, Dave Ramsey, Joe Pags and Coast to Coast AM with George Noory. Most of WOOD Radio's weekday lineup comes from iHeart's Premiere Networks.

Weekend programs and hosts include: "Leo Laporte: The Tech Guy", Gordon Deal, "The Weekend with Michael Brown", Bill Cunningham and "Jill On Money".

WOOD Radio's local newsroom provides local, regional and national news every day of the week, plus world and national news from Fox News Radio. It also utilizes reports and breaking news coverage through an ancillary affiliation with CBS News Radio.

WOOD Radio is the Grand Rapids home of University of Michigan Wolverines football and basketball. It also carries Grand Rapids Griffins ice hockey, though some games are shifted to sister station WMAX-FM. It had long been the Grand Rapids affiliate for Detroit Tigers baseball, but those games moved to WFGR for the 2026 season.

== See also ==
- WOOD-FM for information on WOOD 1300's simulcast on 106.9 FM.
