= WSLI (AM) =

Radio station in Kentwood, Michigan

Coordinates: 42°50′36.1″N 85°37′7.1″W

- Kentwood, Michigan; United States
- Broadcast area: Grand Rapids metropolitan area
- Frequency: 1480 kHz
- Branding: Smile FM

Programming
- Format: Contemporary Christian
- Network: Smile FM

Ownership
- Owner: Ed and Jennifer Czelada; (Smile FM)

History
- First air date: December 11, 1954 (as WMAX)
- Former call signs: WMAX (1954–1968); WAFT (1968–1971); WMAX (1971–1992); WGVU (1992–2022)

Technical information
- Licensing authority: FCC
- Facility ID: 24785
- Class: B
- Power: (STA) 100 watts unlimited
- Translator: 95.3 W237CZ (Grand Rapids)
- Repeater: 90.9 WSLI-FM (Belding)

Links
- Public license information: Public file; LMS
- Website: www.smile.fm

WSLI (1480 kHz) is a non-commercial, listener-supported AM radio station which serves the Grand Rapids metropolitan area. The station is licensed to Kentwood, Michigan, a Grand Rapids suburb. It simulcasts Smile FM's contemporary Christian music format with sister station WSLI-FM 90.9 MHz.

The station is currently operating on a Special Temporary Authority, operating on 100 watts non-directional 24/7 from a random wire antenna strung off a tower near the corner of Coldbrook Street NE and Clancy Ave NE in downtown Grand Rapids. Work is being done to secure a new permanent transmitter site.

Formerly by day, WSLI was powered at 2,000 watts and used a non-directional antenna. To protect other stations on 1480 AM from interference, at night it used a directional antenna with a four-tower array. It was unusual in that it increases its nighttime power to 5,000 watts. The towers were located at Kalamazoo Avenue and M-6, which have since been dismantled.

Programming is also heard on 120-watt FM translator W237CZ at 95.3 MHz in Grand Rapids.

== History ==
=== WMAX ===
The station signed on the air on December 11, 1954, as WMAX. By the late 1950s and early 1960s, it was the leading Top 40 music station in Grand Rapids. Afterward, the station played mostly middle of the road and adult contemporary music (and briefly used the WAFT call letters for a time in the late 1960s/early 1970s). WMAX did briefly return to a Top 40-style presentation from about 1972 to 1975 as "Good Max Music 1480".

The station dropped its music format in January 1976 for a news and talk format. WMAX NewsRadio 1480 operated as a locally produced all-news radio station from 1976 to 1984, with a staff of 11 reporters. Later, the station dropped the news/talk format for urban gospel music, then contemporary Christian music. For many years, WMAX was the Grand Rapids radio home for Detroit Red Wings hockey. WMAX changed transmitter location, adding a directional night-time signal. Its city of license switched from Grand Rapids to Kentwood in 1984.

The station briefly went silent until July 4, 1991. On Independence Day, it became branded as "All-American NewsTalk 1480 WMAX". The station had its studios in the Witte Travel Building at 3250 28th Street S.E., near Shaffer Avenue. The station simulcast the cable TV network audio signal of CNN Headline News most of the day. At the :24 and :54 marks of each hour during morning drive, noon hour and afternoon drive, WMAX would cut in with a six-minute locally produced newscast, before resuming the simulcast at the top or bottom of the hour. Dave Stanley was the program director and James Gemmell was the news director. The owners sold the station in early 1992 to Grand Valley State University. It was briefly off the air until the university took over.

=== WGVU ===
Grand Valley switched the call letters to WGVU on May 22, 1992. It served as a non-commercial public radio station and was a National Public Radio member station. NPR News was heard at the beginning of the hour (although the station did not air NPR long-form news programming such as Morning Edition and All Things Considered). In 1998, Grand Valley took control of WGVS (850 AM) in Muskegon and converted it into a simulcast of WGVU. Formerly, the station broadcast in AM stereo for years before converting to the newer HD Radio format. WTKG was the only other AM station in the area with an HD signal.

On August 27, 2009, WGVU and WGVS flipped to an oldies format—a first for a public radio station. The station's playlist encompassed hits from the mid-1950s through the mid-1970s. It featured many seldom-heard songs not typically played on commercial oldies stations, including some titles by local Michigan artists. Big band, traditional pop, adult standards and easy listening songs from the 1940s through the 1970s were featured on Sunday mornings during the Sunday Morning Standards program. Also airing on Sundays was the West Michigan Top 40 show, which counted down the songs on a historic local record chart from a given date.

Victor Lundberg, a newscaster at WMAX, had a Top 10 hit on the Billboard Hot 100 in 1967 with a spoken-word piece titled "An Open Letter to My Teenage Son". The WMAX call sign was originally granted for a station in Ann Arbor in 1922, and now belongs to a Catholic-formatted AM station in Bay City, Michigan. In addition, 96.1 FM, licensed to Holland, Michigan, and serving the Grand Rapids market, operates as WMAX-FM, but it has no relationship to 1480 AM.

=== WSLI ===
In late 2021, Grand Valley State University announced that it would end the "Real Oldies" format and stop broadcasting on WGVU and WGVS, effective on January 7, 2022. WGVU-TV and WGVU-FM were not affected by the shutdown of the AM stations. The university originally planned to return the AM stations' licenses to the Federal Communications Commission (FCC) and sell their transmitter sites.

On October 6, 2022, Smile FM, a network of Christian radio stations in Michigan, announced it would buy WGVU. It filed a $60,000 deal to purchase WGVU from Grand Valley State University. The purchase was consummated on December 7, 2022, at which point the station changed its call sign to WSLI.

The "Real Oldies" format continues to be available as a free internet stream through Live365, Audacy and iHeartRadio as "Real Oldies Music Radio". It uses the large music library of the former WGVU and WGVS.

== Sources ==
- James Gemmell, 1480 WMAX News Director, 1991. "The former WMAX became "All-American NewsTalk 1480 WMAX" in June 1991, going on-air July 4, 1991 - a day when President George H.W. Bush was visiting Grand Rapids.. We ran a simulcast of CNN Headline News' 24/7 all-news format, cutting away from the entertainment portions at the :24 and :54 marks past each hour weekdays, inserting local news/wx/tx/sports in those time-slots. Dave Stanley was the Program Director, and Greg Chandler, Terry DeBoer and Darren Taylor were some of our reporters. Mary Ogle was another person on-staff. The owners later sold the station (1480 AM) to Grand Valley State".
