= This Morning, America's First News with Gordon Deal =

- Genre: News
- Running time: 1 hour
- Country of origin: United States
- Language: English
- Syndicates: Compass Media Networks
- Hosted by: Gordon Deal
- Website: www.thismorningwithgordondeal.com

This Morning: America's First News (formerly The Wall Street Journal This Morning) is a two-hour radio news/talk program hosted by Gordon Deal and Jennifer Kushinka, who replaced long-serving co-host Gina Cervetti on January 2, 2015. In addition to national and world headlines, the program covers a broad range of topics such as business, finance, lifestyle, careers, technology, and more. This Morning is broadcast on over 250 radio stations across the United States in early-morning drive time. Segments are repackaged into a weekend review show and podcast. Deal began hosting the program in November 2005, following the departure of Michael Wallace, who hosted the program for two years. Until January 2015, the program was produced by the Wall Street Journal Radio Network, which The Wall Street Journal shut down on December 31, 2014 due to corporate cutbacks and its placement on an advertiser blacklist.

In advance of the shutdown, the program was acquired by Compass Media Networks, which took over syndication and production. (Gina Cervetti, along with several other Wall Street Journal Radio staffers, were hired by Bloomberg Radio.) Its final edition was on January 1, 2015. The first broadcast under the new title and ownership was the next day.

In 2026, the program added additional affiliates following the cancellation of its main remaining competitor, America in the Morning.
