= WTRV =

Radio station in Walker–Grand Rapids, Michigan

Coordinates: 43.016°N 85.740°W

- Walker, Michigan; United States
- Broadcast area: Grand Rapids metropolitan area
- Frequency: 100.5 MHz
- Branding: 100.5 The River

Programming
- Format: Classic hits

Ownership
- Owner: Townsquare Media; (Townsquare Media of Grand Rapids, Inc.)
- Sister stations: WFGR, WGRD-FM, WLHT-FM, WNWZ

History
- First air date: June 15, 1993 (as WQFN)
- Former call signs: WQFN (9/20/1991-6/26/1998)
- Call sign meaning: W The RiVer

Technical information
- Licensing authority: FCC
- Facility ID: 72529
- Class: A
- ERP: 3,000 watts
- HAAT: 100 meters (328 ft)

Links
- Public license information: Public file; LMS
- Webcast: Listen Live
- Website: rivergrandrapids.com

WTRV (100.5 FM) is a commercial radio station broadcasting a classic hits radio format. The station is licensed to Walker, Michigan, and serves the Grand Rapids metropolitan area radio market. WTRV is a Class A station, so it is limited to 3,000 watts. Its signal can be heard as far south as Otsego, far east as Ionia, and as far north as Fremont.

The studios and offices are on Ottawa Avenue NW in Grand Rapids. The transmitter is on Peach Ridge Avenue NW at 3 Mile Road, near Interstate 96.

== History ==
=== WQFN ===
On June 15, 1993, the station first signed on as WQFN. It was owned by William E. Kuiper, Jr. and had its studios and offices on Fremont Avenue NW. Kuiper served as the president and general manager, while his wife Ruth was the sales manager.

For several years, WQFN was co-owned with Christian radio station WFUR and operated out of the WFUR studios. Originally WQFN was a fully automated adult contemporary station. After a year, it flipped to Smooth Jazz fed via satellite from Jones Radio Networks. The smooth jazz format was a moderate ratings success.

=== Capstar ownership ===
In 1998, the station was acquired by Capstar, which later became part of iHeartMedia, Inc. Capstar switched the call sign to WTRV.

WTRV logo 1998-2018

The station featured a middle of the road (MOR) and soft AC format featuring a mix of light oldies and selected recent songs, from artists such as The Carpenters, Barry Manilow, Neil Diamond and Barbra Streisand. These acts were no longer played on competitor and former easy listening station WOOD-FM (now WSRW).

=== Regent/Townsquare ownership ===
In 2000, the ownership changed again, this time to Regent Communications. At the beginning of 2015, the station added more soft oldies and pop songs dating back to the 1970s, resulting in selected previously dropped tracks by artists such as the Carpenters and Manilow being re-added into rotation and becoming a younger-skewing version of the original "River." The core artists include Celine Dion, Billy Joel, Elton John, Whitney Houston and Rod Stewart. The station's playlist then resembled gold-based soft AC stations such as WFEZ in Miami and WDUV in Tampa.

WTRV aired Delilah's syndicated nighttime love-songs show for a time until it moved to sister station WLHT and later to what is now WSRW. Delilah is syndicated by Premiere Networks, a subsidiary of iHeartMedia, which owns WSRW.

=== Christmas Music ===
WTRV was the first station in the Grand Rapids market to switch to a format of all-Christmas music between Thanksgiving Week/Mid-November and Christmas Day. However, in 2007, the station did not make the usual switch. WTRV opted to continue with its regular format, with Christmas music mixed in for the holiday season. Meanwhile co-owned hot adult contemporary station WLHT-FM went all-Christmas (which it had never done before) to compete with WOOD-FM, which also goes all-Christmas every holiday season. In 2010, WTRV returned to an all-Christmas music format for the holidays, because WLHT-FM had moved to an adult Top 40 sound, not usually associated with Christmas music.

In 2018, WTRV was the first station in the United States to flip to the all-Christmas format when it made the switch on October 29. Early adopters (such as frequent first-in-the-nation WEZW in South Jersey) waited until November 1 to switch, which factored into WTRV's decision to flip early. On October 29, 2019 at 5:00pm CDT WTRV flipped to the all-Christmas format, making it the 2nd station in the US for the 2019 Holiday season to flip to all-Christmas music, next to WWIZ which flipped on October 25, 2019 (though WWIZ's move, which included a change to a "Christmas" brand, was suspected of being a stunt). WTRV changed at the same time as WLTC in Cusseta, Georgia.

=== Pivot from Soft AC to Mainstream AC ===
It was reported on May 19, 2024, that WTRV was beginning to reduce the amount of softer, older music they were playing on the station and adding more modern, upbeat music.

=== Flip to Classic Hits ===
On December 26, 2025, WTRV changed their format from adult contemporary to classic hits, still under the "100.5 The River" branding. This filled a classic hits format hole in Grand Rapids after sister station WFGR changed their format to sports.
