= WMRR =

Radio station in Muskegon Heights, Michigan

Coordinates: 43.277°N 86.335°W

- Muskegon Heights, Michigan; United States
- Broadcast area: Muskegon, Michigan
- Frequency: 101.7 MHz (HD Radio)
- Branding: Rock 101-7

Programming
- Format: Classic rock
- Affiliations: United Stations Radio Networks

Ownership
- Owner: iHeartMedia, Inc.; (iHM Licenses, LLC)
- Sister stations: WKBZ; WOOD-FM; WMUS

History
- First air date: March 29, 1974
- Former call signs: WKJR-FM (1974–1990); WQFN (1990–1991); WQWQ-FM (1991–1992)
- Call sign meaning: "Muskegon Rock Radio"

Technical information
- Licensing authority: FCC
- Facility ID: 24640
- Class: B1
- ERP: 12,000 watts
- HAAT: 145 meters (476 ft)

Links
- Public license information: Public file; LMS
- Webcast: Listen live (via iHeartRadio)
- Website: rock1017fm.iheart.com

WMRR (101.7 FM, "Rock 101-7") is a radio station broadcasting a classic rock format. Licensed to Muskegon Heights, Michigan, it first began broadcasting under the WKJR call sign.

WMRR identifies itself hourly with the slogan Broadcasting from the Beer Tent Capital of the World. This reference was coined by then Program Director, Don Beno, and now serves as an unofficial nickname for the city of Muskegon, Michigan.

== History ==
The station began as WKJR-FM in 1974, sister station to the now-defunct WKJR (AM 1520). At the time, both stations were formatted with Christian radio programming and owned by the Kuiper family which also owned WFUR-AM and FM in Grand Rapids and WKPR in Kalamazoo. In the early 1980s WKJR-FM separated programming to air a beautiful music format as WABM. The Kuiper family sold the station in 1986 to Goodrich Radio, which at the same time acquired competitor easy listening station 104.5 WQWQ; Goodrich moved the WQWQ calls and format to 101.7 and launched a Top-40 format as "104.5 Sunny-FM" with the calls WSNX. Coinciding with an industry trend away from the beautiful music/easy listening format as its demographics became older and unsalable, WQWQ moved to adult contemporary as WQFN "Fun 101.7" in 1990, back to the WQWQ calls and easy format a year later, and then to album oriented rock as WMRR in 1992.

=== HD programming ===
WMRR transmits in HD Radio and features:

- HD1 - a digital simulcast of the traditional analog signal - Rock 101.7.
- HD2 - not presently in use. A variety of formats had aired on this channel, but in September 2022, the HD2 service was terminated.
