= Webberville, Michigan =

- Village
- Village of Webberville
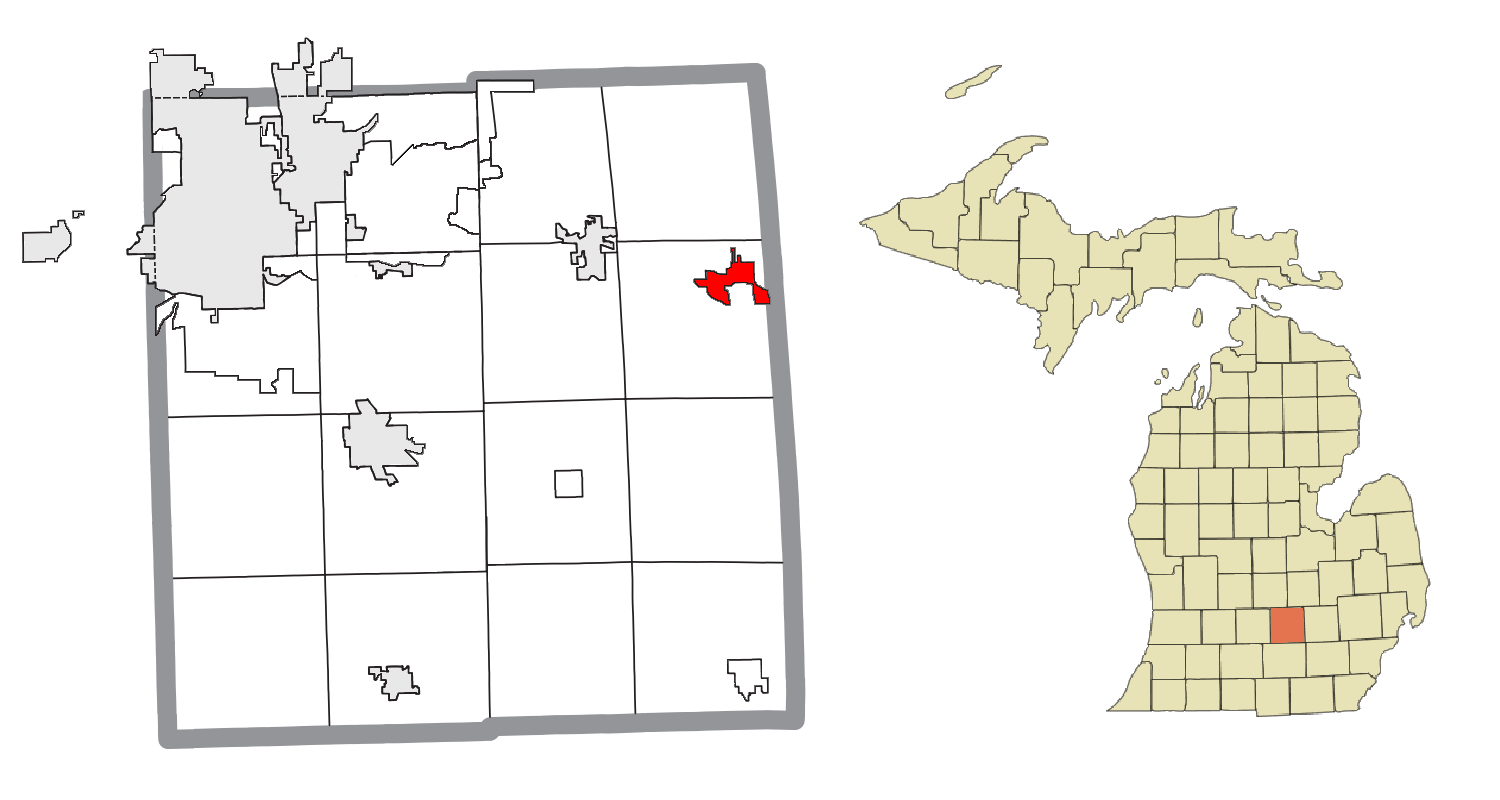
- Location within Ingham County

- Location within the state of Michigan Location within the United States
- Coordinates: 42°39′51″N 84°10′47″W
- Country: United States
- State: Michigan
- County: Ingham
- Township: Leroy
- Settled: 1837

Government
  - Type: Village council
  - President: Brad Hitchcock Sr.
  - Clerk: Jaymee Hord

Area
  - Total: 1.83 sq mi (4.74 km^{2})
  - Land: 1.82 sq mi (4.71 km^{2})
  - Water: 0.012 sq mi (0.03 km^{2})
- Elevation: 876 ft (267 m)

Population (2020)
  - Total: 1,288
  - Density: 707.7/sq mi (273.26/km^{2})
- Time zone: UTC-5 (Eastern (EST))
  - Summer (DST): UTC-4 (EDT)
- ZIP code(s): 48892
- Area code: 517
- FIPS code: 26-85080
- GNIS feature ID: 2400119
- Website: Official website

Webberville is a village in Ingham County in the U.S. state of Michigan. It is located within Leroy Township. The population was 1,288 at the 2020 census.

The village is just northeast of the junction of M-43 and M-52 with I-96. It is about 5 miles (8.0 km) southeast of Williamston and about 20 miles (32 km) southeast of Lansing.

== Geography ==
According to the United States Census Bureau, the village had a total area of 1.84 square miles (4.77 km^{2}), of which 1.83 square miles (4.74 km^{2}) is land and 0.01 square miles (0.03 km^{2}) is water.

== History ==
Webberville was settled in 1837 by Ephraim Meech. It was originally named Phelpstown. In 1850 it was renamed Leroy after Daniel LeRoy the first Attorney General of the state of Michigan. It was renamed Webberville in 1867 when the post office was reestablished since there was another town in Michigan named Leroy. Webberville was for the postmaster Hubert Webber.

== Demographics ==
Historical population
Census	Pop.	Note	%±
1880	489		—
1890	404		−17.4%
1900	346		−14.4%
1910	349		0.9%
1920	465		33.2%
1930	488		4.9%
1940	508		4.1%
1950	600		18.1%
1960	664		10.7%
1970	1,251		88.4%
1980	1,535		22.7%
1990	1,698		10.6%
2000	1,503		−11.5%
2010	1,272		−15.4%
2020	1,288		1.3%
U.S. Decennial Census

=== 2010 census ===
As of the census of 2010, there were 1,272 people, 508 households, and 352 families living in the village. The population density was 695.1 inhabitants per square mile (268.4/km^{2}). There were 573 housing units at an average density of 313.1 per square mile (120.9/km^{2}). The racial makeup of the village was 97.5% White, 0.6% African American, 0.2% Native American, 0.1% Asian, 0.8% from other races, and 0.9% from two or more races. Hispanic or Latino of any race were 2.7% of the population.

There were 508 households, of which 35.4% had children under the age of 18 living with them, 49.8% were married couples living together, 14.0% had a female householder with no husband present, 5.5% had a male householder with no wife present, and 30.7% were non-families. 26.8% of all households were made up of individuals, and 6.5% had someone living alone who was 65 years of age or older. The average household size was 2.50 and the average family size was 3.01.

The median age in the village was 35.6 years. 26.4% of residents were under the age of 18; 8.1% were between the ages of 18 and 24; 28.5% were from 25 to 44; 27.7% were from 45 to 64; and 9.2% were 65 years of age or older. The gender makeup of the village was 49.6% male and 50.4% female.

=== 2000 census ===
As of the census of 2000, there were 1,503 people, 561 households, and 403 families living in the village. The population density was 1,207.0 inhabitants per square mile (466.0/km^{2}). There were 612 housing units at an average density of 491.5 per square mile (189.8/km^{2}). The racial makeup of the village was 97.01% White, 0.60% African American, 0.27% Native American, 0.33% Asian, 0.40% from other races, and 1.40% from two or more races. Hispanic or Latino of any race were 1.06% of the population.

There were 561 households, out of which 41.0% had children under the age of 18 living with them, 51.2% were married couples living together, 15.9% had a female householder with no husband present, and 28.0% were non-families. 22.1% of all households were made up of individuals, and 6.4% had someone living alone who was 65 years of age or older. The average household size was 2.68 and the average family size was 3.12.

In the village, the population was spread out, with 30.7% under the age of 18, 9.7% from 18 to 24, 34.5% from 25 to 44, 17.8% from 45 to 64, and 7.3% who were 65 years of age or older. The median age was 31 years. For every 100 females, there were 93.4 males. For every 100 females age 18 and over, there were 86.4 males.

The median income for an average household in the village was $45,388, and the median income for a family was $47,625. Males had a median income of $38,375 versus $23,563 for females. The per capita income for the village was $17,663. About 4.7% of families and 5.5% of the population were below the poverty line, including 6.8% of those under age 18 and 6.1% of those age 65 or over.
