= WGVU-FM =

Public radio station in Allendale–Grand Rapids, Michigan

WGVU-FM and WGVS-FM
WGVU-FM: Allendale, Michigan; WGVS-FM: Whitehall, Michigan; United States
- Broadcast area: WGVU-FM: Grand Rapids, Michigan; WGVS-FM: Muskegon, Michigan
- Frequencies: WGVU-FM: 88.5 MHz; WGVS-FM: 95.3 MHz
- Branding: WGVU Radio

Programming
- Format: News/talk; jazz
- Affiliations: NPR; Public Radio Exchange

Ownership
- Owner: Grand Valley State University
- Sister stations: WGVU-TV, WGVK

History
- First air date: WGVU-FM: July 17, 1983; WGVS-FM: 1975
- Former call signs: WGVU-FM: WSRX (1974–83); WGVC-FM (1983–87); WGVS-FM: WLRC-FM (1972–74); WLRQ (1974–79); WTHW (1979–80); WCNF (1980–83); WRNF (1983-86); WKBZ-FM (1986–99)
- Call sign meaning: Grand Valley State University

Technical information
- Licensing authority: FCC
- Facility ID: WGVU-FM: 4174; WGVS-FM: 33696
- Class: WGVU-FM: A; WGVS-FM: A
- ERP: WGVU-FM: 4,000 watts; WGVS-FM: 2,000 watts
- HAAT: WGVU-FM: 90 meters (300 ft); WGVS-FM: 110 meters (360 ft)
- Transmitter coordinates: WGVU-FM: 43°3′24.1″N 85°57′37.2″W; WGVS-FM: 43°21′14″N 86°19′38.2″W
- Translator(s): WGVU-FM: 95.3 W237CZ (Grand Rapids)

Links
- Public license information: WGVU-FM: Public file; LMS; WGVS-FM: Public file; LMS
- Webcast: Listen live
- Website: wgvunews.org

WGVU-FM is an NPR member station serving Grand Rapids, Michigan. Owned by Grand Valley State University, it is simulcast in West Michigan. The main broadcast frequency is 88.5 MHz, which is licensed to Allendale, the Grand Rapids suburb that is home to Grand Valley State's main campus. It is simulcast on WGVS-FM 95.3 MHz, which is licensed to Whitehall and serves Muskegon. The format is talk radio from NPR, along with jazz.

== History ==
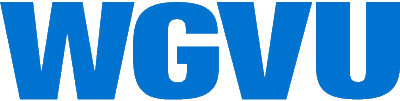
Former logo

WGVU-FM began broadcasting on July 17, 1983, as WGVC-FM, owned by what was then Grand Valley State College. The station had originally operated (1974–1982) as student-run WSRX, with an alternative rock format. It was the first locally-focused NPR station in Grand Rapids, and the fourth full NPR member in West Michigan, joining WVGR, a repeater of WUOM-FM in Ann Arbor, WMUK in Kalamazoo, and WBLV in Twin Lake. As a legacy of its time as a campus radio station, WGVU-FM operates with an effective radiated power of 4,000 watts from its transmitter near Coopersville. This is fairly modest for a full NPR member on the FM band; most of Grand Rapids and its inner-ring suburbs only get a marginal signal. To make up for this shortfall, Grand Valley operates a translator in Grand Rapids proper, W237CZ on 95.3 FM.

WGVS-FM in Whitehall began as Top 40 station WLRQ ("Super Q") in the late 1970s. In the mid-1980s, the station bore the WRNF ("We're Rock Ninety Five") calls while continuing with a Top 40 format. By the mid-1990s, 95.3 FM had the callsign WKBZ-FM and was airing an urban contemporary format as "Power 95.3". Station owners Robert Jewell and Daniel Thill donated WKBZ-FM, along with WKBZ (850 AM), to Grand Valley in 1995, but the following year the stations were sold to WLC Broadcasting, and it was not until November 1998 that WLC returned the stations to Grand Valley and the university began using them as simulcasts of the WGVU stations. WGVS's transmitter is south of Whitehall. While the main signal at 88.5 decently covers Muskegon itself, it is spotty in areas north of the city.

WGVU-FM 88.5 formerly broadcast in HD Radio and operated two side channels. WGVU-FM HD2 was a simulcast of "Real Oldies" 1480 WGVU and 850 WGVS, and WGVU-FM HD3 was all jazz. Additionally the station's audio simulcasts on the digital subchannels of WGVU/WGVK-TV on channel 35.4/52.4 via the secondary audio program of that station (WGVU/WGVS is on the main audio channel), which features scrolling television schedules along with visual song/artist information for the radio audio.

WGVU-FM was the 2011 Michigan Association of Broadcasters Public Radio Station of the year among stations with a $2 million plus budget. This ended a long winning streak by Michigan Radio (now Michigan Public).

== Translator ==
Call sign	Frequency	City of license	FID	ERP (W)	HAAT	Class	Transmitter coordinates	FCC info	Notes
W237CZ	95.3 FM	Grand Rapids, Michigan	147577	120	55.1 m (181 ft)	D	42°55′19″N 85°41′7.1″W	LMS	Relays WGVU-FM
