= WKBZ (1520 AM) =

Radio station in Muskegon, Michigan (1963–2001)

Coordinates: 43°8′27.6″N 86°14′49.2″W

- Muskegon Heights, Michigan; United States
- Broadcast area: Muskegon, Michigan
- Frequency: 1520 kHz

Programming
- Format: Children's/CHR

Ownership
- Owner: WLC Broadcasting

History
- First air date: February 1963
- Last air date: March 2001
- Former call signs: WKJR (1963–1990); WQWQ (1990–1992, 1992–1999); WWEZ (February 1 – July 24, 1992)

Technical information
- Facility ID: 47109
- Class: B
- Power: 10,000 watts day; 1,000 watts night

WKBZ was a radio station on 1520 kHz in Muskegon Heights, Michigan. It broadcast between 1963 and 2001 and was last owned by WLC Broadcasting.

== History ==
The construction permit for WKJR, a daytime-only station on 1520, was obtained on September 27, 1962. The permit was owned by William and William Eugene Kuiper, doing business as the Muskegon Heights Broadcasting Company. The station hit the air in February 1963 and increased its daytime power to 10,000 watts in 1971. The station suffered a humorous accident in 1975 when a field mouse crawled into the transmitter site, shorting out a transformer and keeping the station off the air for 45 minutes during its broadcast of a high school basketball game.

In 1979, majority control was transferred to another Kuiper business—the Furniture City Broadcasting Corporation, which owned WFUR in Grand Rapids—which procured authorization two years later to broadcast at night with 500 watts. March 1974 brought an FM sister station, WKJR-FM 101.7 (now WMRR); the stations broadcast religious programming.

WKJR was acquired in 1990 by Pathfinder Communications Corporation as part of a $1.27 million purchase and became WQWQ, call letters formerly on its sister FM, and that the AM station would use for almost all of the 1990s and through sales to Muskegon Lakeshore Broadcasting in 1994 and WLC Broadcasting in 1997. (The station briefly went by WWEZ for five months in 1992.) Upon becoming WQWQ, the station flipped to soft adult contemporary, and after trying hot AC that fall, moved back to soft AC in early 1991 in order to ensure an FM station did not fill the format void. WLC was owned by Bishop Nathaniel Wells and flipped WQWQ back to a religious format, with gospel music and church services. In 1998, as part of a bankruptcy settlement, WLC donated its WKBZ at 850 kHz to Grand Valley State University, which became WGVS. The WKBZ intellectual unit, news/talk programming and call letters were retained by the seller and moved to 1520 kHz.

However, WLC's financial troubles continued. After a sale to Harbor Pointe Broadcasting collapsed because the company went bankrupt, the station went off the air in March 2001, when WLC Broadcasting became bankrupt and its assets claimed by creditors. The station became an affiliate of Radio Disney during its final two months of operation. The station's license was officially cancelled in June 2002.
