= WNWZ =

Coordinates: 42°59′14″N 85°37′26″W

- Grand Rapids, Michigan; United States
- Broadcast area: Grand Rapids metropolitan area
- Frequency: 1410 kHz
- Branding: Magic 104.9

Programming
- Format: Urban contemporary
- Affiliations: Compass Media Networks

Ownership
- Owner: Townsquare Media; (Townsquare Media of Grand Rapids, Inc.)
- Sister stations: WFGR, WGRD-FM, WLHT-FM, WTRV

History
- First air date: 1948 (as WGRD)
- Former call signs: WRCV (7/5/96-9/4/98); WGRD (5/14/90-7/5/96); WKTH (3/17/86-5/14/90); WXQT (6/29/81-3/17/86); WGRD (1948-6/29/81)
- Call sign meaning: W NeWZ (former news branding)

Technical information
- Licensing authority: FCC
- Facility ID: 55648
- Class: D
- Power: 1,000 watts day 48 watts night
- Translator: 104.9 W285FO (Grand Rapids)

Links
- Public license information: Public file; LMS
- Webcast: Listen Live
- Website: mymagicgr.com

WNWZ (1410 AM, "Magic 104.9") is a radio station broadcasting an urban contemporary format, licensed to Grand Rapids, Michigan.

The station is simulcast on FM translator W285FO (104.9), licensed to Grand Rapids.

== History ==
=== WGRD ===
The station first began broadcasting under the WGRD call sign in 1948. As AM 1410 was originally a daytime-only station, the WGRD calls stood for Grand Rapids Daytime. The station adopted the Top 40 music format in 1959 and was a top-rated station in the Grand Rapids market during the late 1950s and early 1960s, though the station had lost ground to WLAV 1340 and WZZM-FM 95.7 by the end of the decade. WGRD made a number of format adjustments in the mid-1960s in response to its falling ratings, shifting to an adult contemporary format in 1964 and then to a Top 40/oldies mix the following year before tweaking back to Top 40 in 1967. WGRD reclaimed its market dominance after it added an FM signal at 97.9 MHz in 1971 (formerly WXTO), though AM 1410 was relegated to being a simulcast of the FM signal mornings and afternoons. For part of that time middays were "shadowcast." Same format, different dj.

=== WXQT/Great Gold 14-K ===
In 1981, WGRD dropped its simulcast (middays were shadowcast) of the FM station and switched to a "Big Band" Music of Your Life format as WXQT. In 1984, WXQT flipped to oldies as "GREAT GOLD 14-K", which stood for "14 Karat Gold", focusing on pop oldies from 1958-1972. Under the direction of PD Allen Jackson, "The NEW 14-K" featured Jack Stack (who had done mornings on WGRD and WLAV back in the 1960s) mornings, Rich Kennedy middays, Larry Olek afternoons and Pugs Stella evenings. The station earned a respectable 2.4 share 12+ in the Summer 1984 Arbitron. In 1986, the local lineup was dropped in favor of the ABC/Satellite Music Network "Pure Gold" satellite format. Ratings crashed to a 0.9 share in the summer of 1986 Arbitron, under the new call sign WKTH.

=== More changes ===
In 1988, the station adopted Satellite Music Network's Z-Rock format, keeping the WKTH call letters. The station reverted to the WGRD calls in 1991, moving back to a simulcast of 97.9 FM's CHR format (which changed to Modern Rock in 1994). In 1996, WGRD changed calls to WRCV and switched to ABC Radio's syndicated "Real Country" format. The station continued to be a non-factor in the ratings. In September 1998, 1410 changed its calls to WNWZ and adopted a simulcast of CNN Headline News, which was replaced by News/Talk in October 2001 (mostly syndicated from the Michigan Talk Radio Network).

=== La Maquina Musical ===
A Spanish pop hits format was adopted on January 1, 2003, and was somewhat successful in the ratings given its poor signal, often ranking as Grand Rapids' third most popular AM station (behind only WOOD and WBBL) (see: 1). WNWZ was the first radio station to cater to the Spanish-speaking community in Grand Rapids 24 hours a day. In August 2010, a reunion of more than 60 former WGRD staff members was held in Grand Rapids, which included market legend Bruce Grant, the original program director from 1948, and dozens of other personalities from the AM 1410/97.9 history.

=== Funny 1410 ===
On November 14, 2011, the station changed its format to comedy calling itself "Funny 1410".

=== Touch 1410 ===
On August 3, 2013, WNWZ flipped to Urban Adult Contemporary, branded as "The Touch". The station became the West Michigan home of the Steve Harvey Morning Show and remains as such today. Outside of the morning show, the station aired Westwood One's "The Touch" full-time.

=== Magic 94.1 ===
On June 10, 2016, WNWZ began simulcasting on FM translator W231DD (94.1, licensed to Grand Rapids), and rebranded as "Magic 94.1." The station also dropped the "Touch" feed for locally originated programming.

=== Magic 104.9 ===
On October 24, 2016, WNWZ rebranded as "Magic 104.9" as translator W231DD moved from 94.1 FM to 104.9 FM as W285FO and raised power from 88 watts to 250 watts.

In March 2020, WNWZ began adding more hip hop tracks, and shifted to urban contemporary, while retaining the "Magic" moniker.

== Previous logo ==
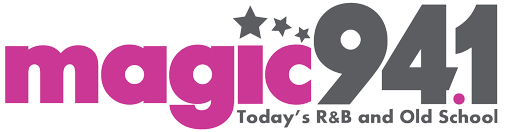
(WNWZ's logo under previous 94.1 translator frequency)

(WNWZ's logo under previous Urban Adult Contemporary format)
