= WMAX (AM) =

- Bay City, Michigan; United States
- Broadcast area: Saginaw-Bay City-Midland
- Frequency: 1440 kHz
- Branding: Ave Maria Radio

Programming
- Format: Religious; Catholic based talk/sermons

Ownership
- Owner: Word Broadcasters; (AM Media Services, LLC)

History
- First air date: June 15, 1925
- Former call signs: WSKC (1925–1930); WBCM (1930–1977); WRDD (1977–1979); WBCM (1979–1991); WUNI (7/30/91–7/30/92)
- Former frequencies: 1150 kHz (1925–1941)

Technical information
- Licensing authority: FCC
- Class: B
- Power: 5,000 watts (Daytime); 2,500 watts (Nighttime)
- Transmitter coordinates: 43°31′27″N 83°57′58″W
- Translator: (105.9 MHz) W290DM (Midland)

Links
- Public license information: Public file; LMS
- Website: Official website

WMAX (1440 AM) is a radio station broadcasting a Catholic religious format. It is co-owned with WDEO 990 AM in Ypsilanti, Michigan, and features the same programming from the EWTN Global Catholic Radio network. It transmits from a site along West Freeland Road in Saginaw using a three-tower inline directional antenna system.

== History ==
Licensed to Bay City, Michigan, it first began broadcasting on June 15, 1925 as WSKC at 1150 kHz, with its call sign reflecting its ownership by the World's Star Knitting Co. It was the first radio station in the Tri-Cities and first Michigan radio station north of Flint. In 1930, the call sign changed to WBCM, followed by a shift in frequency in 1941 to 1440 kHz. WBCM served the Bay City area as a local station for many years with a variety of formats including MOR and country music.

WBCM began experimenting with FM radio in 1947, one of the first in the region. WBCM-FM was located at 96.1 mHz and broadcast from an over 300 foot (90m) Blaw-Knox tower at the station's Bay City east side studio on Tuscola Rd, initially signing on in 1947. In the late 1960s and early 1970s, 96.1 FM broadcast a beautiful music format. Purchased by Liggett Communications earlier in 1973, on August 27, 1973 the FM calls were changed to WHNN and the station adopted a Top 40 format as "Super Win". Later, Liggett built a new FM tower location in Quanicassee to alleviate a short spaced situation with WHTC-FM Holland, and the power was upped to a legal maximum of 100,000 watts.

In February 1978, Liggett changed the AM format to country, and the call letters to WRDD (Big Red Radio), and also built a new 5 KW AM directional transmitter site for the station along M-84 in southern Frankenlust Township, Michigan. Upon license approval of the new AM facility, he sold WRDD to a local broadcast concern who returned the call letters to WBCM. The station would go through another ownership change and change of call letters briefly to WUNI (You and I) to WMAX in 1992 and simulcast sports-talk station WTRX of Flint. WMAX is of no relation to WMAX-FM 96.1, an IHeartMedia-owned radio station in Holland, Michigan. The simulcast only lasted about ten years when it was then sold to the current Catholic radio operator.

WMAX is also the former call sign of an AM station at 1480 kHz in Grand Rapids, Michigan (now WSLI).

Until April 2018, WMAX's programming was simulcast on WHHQ AM 1250, a station based in Bridgeport that covered much of the same broadcasting area as WMAX.

== Sources ==
- Michiguide.com - WMAX History
