= WTKG =

Coordinates: 42°59′42.1″N 85°40′36.1″W

- Grand Rapids, Michigan; United States
- Frequency: 1230 kHz
- Branding: AM 1230 WTKG

Programming
- Format: News/talk/sports
- Affiliations: Fox News Radio; VSiN Radio; Compass Media Networks; Premiere Networks; Michigan Radio Network; Detroit Pistons; Detroit Red Wings

Ownership
- Owner: iHeartMedia, Inc.; (iHM Licenses, LLC)
- Sister stations: WBCT; WBFX; WMAX-FM; WOOD; WSNX-FM; WSRW-FM

History
- First air date: February 8, 1945
- Former call signs: WJEF (1945–1973); WCUZ (1973–1997)
- Call sign meaning: Talk Grand Rapids

Technical information
- Licensing authority: FCC
- Facility ID: 51729
- Class: C
- Power: 1,000 watts
- Repeater: 96.1 WMAX-FM HD2 (Holland)

Links
- Public license information: Public file; LMS
- Webcast: Listen live (via iHeartRadio)
- Website: wtkg.iheart.com

WTKG (1230 AM) is a radio station broadcasting a news/talk/sports format. Licensed to Grand Rapids, Michigan, United States, and now owned by iHeartMedia, Inc., Previous to adopting the current calls and format in 1997, the station played country under the WJEF (the station on which radio Hall of Famer Wally Phillips started his career) and WCUZ calls.

== History ==
The station began as WJEF on February 8, 1945, with studios located on the 10th floor of the Pantlind Hotel (Amway Grand Plaza Hotel) in Downtown Grand Rapids. Its power at that time was 250 Watts. It would be Grand Rapids' third radio station, after WOOD and WLAV. WJEF was a sister station to WKZO in Kalamazoo; both stations were owned by John Fetzer. In 1951, WJEF would gain an FM sister station in WJEF-FM 93.7. At the same time, it gained a television sister station in WKZO-TV, and affiliation with the CBS Radio Network.

The AM station was sold to Pathfinder Communications in 1973 and would take on the WCUZ call sign on June 18, 1973. WCUZ, and later WCUZ-FM, would be Grand Rapids' only country music station until 1992 when WBCT (the former WJEF-FM) ended WCUZ's hold on the Grand Rapids country music radio audience. During the early 1980s the station would begin broadcasting in AM stereo with the Magnavox system. However AM Stereo broadcasting would end when the Motorola C-QUAM standard won out.

In 1992 WCUZ's former sister station WJFM would also be sold by Fetzer Broadcasting. WJFM flipped to a country format as WBCT and went head to head with WCUZ. In the end WBCT would win out, likely due to the facts that WBCT has a grandfathered 320,000 watt superpower signal and (more likely) because they targeted the younger generation of listeners recently discovering country music.

== Bronco Radio Network ==
WTKG was an affiliate of the Western Michigan University "Broncos Radio Network" and carried all of the Broncos football and men's basketball games. WTKG was dropped as an affiliate after WMAX-FM was added for both sports.
