= WPRR (AM) =

Urban adult contemporary radio station in Grand Rapids, Michigan

- Ada, Michigan; United States
- Broadcast area: Grand Rapids metropolitan area
- Frequency: 1680 kHz
- Branding: 102.5 The Ride

Programming
- Language: English
- Format: Urban adult contemporary
- Affiliations: Rickey Smiley Morning Show

Ownership
- Owner: Ghettothropic, LLC

History
- First air date: September 4, 1998
- Former call signs: WBHD (1998); WJNZ (1999–2003); WDSS (2003–2008)
- Call sign meaning: Public Reality Radio (previous format)

Technical information
- Licensing authority: FCC
- Facility ID: 87106
- Class: B
- Power: 10,000 watts (day); 680 watts (night)
- Transmitter coordinates: 42°56′9″N 85°27′26″W
- Repeater: 102.5 W273DD (Alpine Township)

Links
- Public license information: Public file; LMS

WPRR (1680 kHz, "102.5 The Ride") is a radio station in the Grand Rapids Metropolitan area. The station is currently owned by Goodrich Radio, and airs an urban adult contemporary format.

== History ==
The WDSS logo used on the Grand Rapids page on Radio Disney's website.

WPRR originated as the expanded band "twin" of an existing station on the standard AM band.

On March 17, 1997, the Federal Communications Commission (FCC) announced that eighty-eight stations had been given permission to move to newly available "Expanded Band" transmitting frequencies, ranging from 1610 to 1700 kHz, with WMHG in Muskegon, Michigan authorized to move from 1600 kHz to 1680 kHz.

A construction permit for the expanded band station was assigned the call sign WBHD on September 4, 1998. The FCC's initial policy was that both the original station and its expanded band counterpart could operate simultaneously for up to five years, after which owners would have to turn in one of the two licenses, depending on whether they preferred the new assignment or elected to remain on the original frequency. However, this deadline was extended multiple times, and both stations remained authorized after the initial five year period. (WMHG was deleted on March 3, 2008, after it was determined that its license had been improperly transferred to a new owner).

On October 15, 1998, the station changed its call sign to WJNZ, flipping to an urban contemporary format as "1680 Jamz", giving Grand Rapids its first 24-hour urban station at the time, and the station began broadcasting in C-QUAM AM stereo. By 2003, the station moved to 1140 AM, but that station eventually changed its format to Catholic-centered talk and preaching.

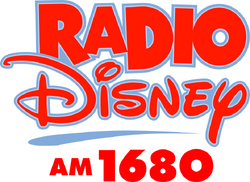
WDSS former logo used from 2003 until 2007.

On June 16, 2003, the call sign was changed to WDSS, with a switch to Radio Disney programming, with a children's/contemporary hit radio format. The station was poorly maintained during the Radio Disney years as station IDs were often mixed up and no ID was heard at the top of the hour.

On August 5, 2008, WDSS discontinued the Radio Disney format, and its AM stereo system, and began broadcasting a continuous-loop announcement that it would change to a "Public Reality Radio" format in September. This announcement also stated that the call sign would change to WPRR on August 18 (the new calls actually took effect two days later). According to station owner Bob Goodrich, Public Reality Radio was a non-profit, educational endeavor, featuring "a variety of podcasts and programming". On September 22, "Public Reality Radio" was launched, which included programming from the Pacifica Radio network.

On July 23, 2020, WPRR dropped the "Public Reality Radio" format (which continued on WPRR-FM 90.1 FM in Allegan County's Clyde Township) and changed their format to urban adult contemporary, branded as "102.5 The Ride".

== Translators ==
In 2010, WPRR established a repeater, W237CZ at 95.3 MHz. Goodrich would acquire the repeater from the Horizon Christian Fellowship in February 2010.

On November 19, 2012, WPRR purchased WXPZ from Larlen Communications. On July 5, 2014, WXPZ's call sign was changed to WPRR-FM.

In 2016, WPRR purchased W273DD at 102.5 MHz and moved it to Alpine Township. This repeater went on air in early 2017.

In mid-2024, Goodrich Radio, LLC sold WPRR and it's FM translator W273DD at 102.5 FM to Ghettothropic, LLC.

On April 22, 2026, WPRR and W273DD went silent, citing finances as the reason of going silent.

As of June, 2026 it is broadcasting on-air and on its website as well.

Call sign	Frequency	City of license	FID	ERP (W)	HAAT	Class	FCC info
W273DD	102.5 FM	Alpine Township, Michigan	145316	155	90 m (295 ft)	D	LMS

== Previous programming ==
Programs previously aired on the station included Democracy Now!, The Thom Hartmann Program, The David Pakman Show, The Union Edge, Loud and Clear with Brian Becker, The Bradcast with Brad Friedman and other local shows.
