= WFGR =

Coordinates: 43.033°N 85.696°W

- Grand Rapids, Michigan; United States
- Frequency: 98.7 MHz
- Branding: Sports Radio 98.7

Programming
- Format: Sports Radio
- Affiliations: 97.1 Detroit Sports Radio Network; ESPN Radio; Detroit Tigers

Ownership
- Owner: Townsquare Media; (Townsquare Media of Grand Rapids, Inc.)
- Sister stations: WGRD-FM, WLHT-FM, WNWZ, WTRV

History
- First air date: August 9, 1992; 33 years ago
- Former call signs: WXJI (7/12/1990–7/8/1992, CP)
- Call sign meaning: "For Grand Rapids"

Technical information
- Licensing authority: FCC
- Facility ID: 25837
- Class: A
- ERP: 2,750 watts
- HAAT: 150 metres (490 ft)

Links
- Public license information: Public file; LMS
- Webcast: Listen live
- Website: sportsradio987.com

WFGR (98.7 FM) is a commercial radio station in Grand Rapids, Michigan. It is owned by Townsquare Media and it airs a sports radio format. Programming is supplied by the 97.1 Detroit Sports Radio Network. As such, it is Grand Rapids' affiliate for ESPN Radio and the Detroit Tigers.

WFGR has an effective radiated power (ERP) of 2,750 watts. The transmitter is on Brambleberry Drive in Comstock Park. The studios are on Ottawa Avenue NW at Fulton Avenue in downtown Grand Rapids.

== History ==
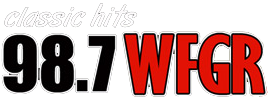
WFGR logo 2009-2017

=== Classical and Oldies ===
WFGR signed on the air on August 9, 1992. It was a classical music station throughout the 1990s, broadcasting the "World Classical Network" from WFCC-FM in Chatham, Massachusetts. It changed its format to oldies music as "Oldies 98.7" on October 11, 2004. At that time, Grand Rapids' previous oldies station, WODJ, switched to album rock as 107.3 WKLQ (now WTNR).

When WFGR debuted its oldies format, it was satellite-delivered using ABC Radio's "Oldies Radio" feed. Shortly thereafter, the station debuted a mostly-local lineup of DJs, playing music from the 1960s and early 1970s.

=== Classic hits ===
On June 29, 2009, the station changed its name to "98.7 WFGR" and began playing classic hits, focusing more on the 1970s and 1980s. The change left the Grand Rapids market without a local outlet for 1960s oldies. But a few months later, Grand Valley State University stepped in to fill the void by flipping its WGVU from NPR news and talk to the "Real Oldies" network.

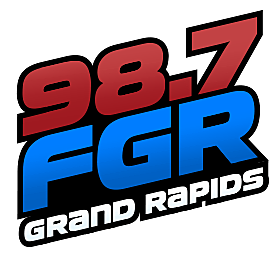
WFGR logo 2022-2024

On October 5, 2009, The Bob & Tom Show, syndicated from Indianapolis, premiered on the morning lineup, Mondays through Saturdays. The show was added when WBFX (then-operated by Clear Channel Communications) did not renew the contract for the show. On October 5, 2012, three years to the day after their premiere, Bob and Tom were replaced with local talent Andy O' Riley and Dave Kaechele. In late 2013, local midday DJ Matt Hendricks was cut from the staff and replaced with a company voice-tracked personality “Big Joe Henry” based in New Jersey. Andy and Dave were also cut from the staff in January 2014, due to low ratings. In early 2014, part-time DJ Lauren was promoted to middays, and Jo Jo Girard, formerly of WWMX in Baltimore and WSNX-FM in Muskegon was introduced as the new WFGR morning show host.

WFGR's wide-ranging classic hits playlist ran for a number of years, becoming increasingly centered on the 1980s as time went by.

On July 3, 2024, WFGR rebranded as “98.7 The Grand”, pivoting to a rock-leaning presentation. Its lineup did not include morning hosts, aside from news and weather updates provided by WXMI. The station used local staff for announcements in the midday and afternoon time slots, and also carried American Top 40 with Casey Kasem.

=== Sports radio ===
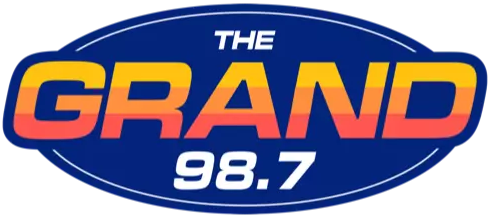
WFGR logo 2024-2025

In November 2025, Audacy, Inc. announced that it would form a statewide sports radio network featuring the local programming of Detroit's WXYT-FM, with four Townsquare Media stations—including WFGR—forming its initial affiliation base. On December 1, 2025, WFGR flipped to sports radio as Sports Radio 98.7, as an affiliate of the 97.1 Detroit Sports Radio Network and ESPN Radio. Unlike the other Townsquare stations that joined the network, WFGR did not adopt the Ticket branding, as that brand is already used by Cumulus Media-owned competitor WJRW.
