= WMAX-FM =

Coordinates: 42.819°N 85.869°W

- Holland, Michigan; United States
- Broadcast area: Grand Rapids, Michigan
- Frequency: 96.1 MHz (HD Radio)
- Branding: 96.1 The Game

Programming
- Format: Sports radio
- Subchannels: HD2: WTKG simulcast (Talk radio)
- Affiliations: Fox Sports Radio; Detroit Pistons; Detroit Red Wings; Detroit Tigers

Ownership
- Owner: iHeartMedia, Inc.; (iHM Licenses, LLC)
- Sister stations: WBCT, WBFX, WOOD, WSNX-FM, WSRW-FM, WTKG

History
- First air date: 1961; 65 years ago
- Former call signs: WHTC-FM (1961–1983); WYXX (1983–1992); WKEZ (1992–1994); WAKX (1994–1997); WVTI (1997–2005)
- Call sign meaning: MAX FM (previous format)

Technical information
- Licensing authority: FCC
- Facility ID: 27471
- Class: B
- ERP: 50,000 watts
- HAAT: 150 meters (490 ft)

Links
- Public license information: Public file; LMS
- Webcast: Listen Live
- Website: 961thegame.iheart.com

WMAX-FM (96.1 MHz) is the callsign of a radio station owned by iHeartMedia located in Grand Rapids, Michigan. The studios and offices are located at 77 Monroe Center in Downtown Grand Rapids while its transmitter is located near Felch St and 32nd Ave south of the town of Hudsonville outside of Grand Rapids.

The station is identified as "96.1 The Game" and carries both locally produced play by play sportscasts and sports talk programs, as well as programming from the Fox Sports Radio network.

WMAX-FM is licensed for HD Radio operations and features a simulcast of talk sister station WTKG on its HD2 side channel.

== History ==
The frequency originally belonged to WHTC-FM, which went on the air in 1961, with an antenna on the WHTC tower in downtown Holland, Michigan. During this time (from the station's inception until the early 1980s), the station was generally being used as a simulcast to WHTC.

In 1981, Michael Walton, of Milwaukee Wisconsin, purchased WHTC and WHTC-FM. By 1983, 96.1 became known as WYXX, with a new tower. After Walton assumed full control of the station, it became a fully automated CHR station, with programming provided by syndicator Century 21. The all-hit format was softened to adult contemporary by 1985, to better compete with existing stations in the Grand Rapids market.

When WOOD-FM dropped its easy listening format in 1992, WYXX adopted the format along with the call letters WKEZ.

By 1994, the station was sold to Federated Media and once Federated had control of the station, a "Young Country" format was adopted. The call letters became WAKX. This format was also unsuccessful; it was not able to effectively compete with WCUZ-FM 101.3/WCUZ 1230, the incumbent country juggernaut at the time. The format changed in 1995 to Hot Adult Contemporary and became known as "Mix 96" and later "Variety 96.1."

In 1997, the station was purchased by Clear Channel Communications and the station became known as "I-96" (taking its name from the highway Interstate 96 passing through Grand Rapids; the station's logo also resembled an interstate highway sign). The call letters were also changed to WVTI. The format shifted from Hot AC to CHR as Continuous Hit Music, I-96. Clear Channel took control of rival station WSNX in the late summer of 1999; much of the "I-96" air lineup moved over to WSNX 104.5, which shifted from CHR/Rhythmic to CHR/Pop as a result, and "I-96" itself shifted back to Hot AC, which it would remain for the next six years. Initially, the station had moderate success as I-96, but as other local radio stations (including sister station WOOD-FM) began putting more Hot AC-oriented acts on their Mainstream AC stations, the ratings began to slide by 2005.

On October 18, 2005, the station flipped to a Jack FM clone called "MAX-FM". It gained the call sign of WMAX from another Clear Channel operation in Chattanooga, Tennessee on November 16, 2005. The station initially was programmed with over 1500 unique songs drawing from various pop music genres. As time went by, the list was honed down to less than 600 songs and the music was more focused on the 1980-early 2000s time period. After a rather respectable ratings showing, the ratings heavily slid by early 2007.

On March 19, 2007, the station retooled itself into a Modern AC-leaning Hot AC presentation, known as "The NEW MAX-FM", which lasted until January 31, 2008.

On January 31, 2008, at 3 PM, after the song Closing Time by Semisonic, the station dropped the Hot AC format and began stunting with the sounds of a ticking clock interspersed with liners that were played every two or three minutes. Some of these liners were in Spanish and made reference to Regent Communications-owned WNWZ AM 1410 and cold, snow-covered cornfields in Hudsonville, Michigan, while others mentioned the time and date of 02/04/08 at 10:01 AM. Songs which served as clues to what the new format would be were played. The songs included Coldplay's "Clocks"; Elvis Presley's "Burning Love"; David Allan Coe's "You Never Even Called Me By My Name", and Hall & Oates' "Private Eyes", among dozens of others. During the stunt, the station's website showed a 12-second viral video clip influenced by the Cloverfield movie, with a message that pointed to the date of February 4, 2008 at 10:01 AM. A year later, WLHT-FM (owned by Regent, now Townsquare Media) would acquire the Adult Top 40 format that had been absent in Grand Rapids for more than a year.

At exactly the promised time, the ticking clock stopped, and the new format, which is known as Radio X 96.1, began. The first song on Radio X was Nirvana's Smells Like Teen Spirit. The Radio X presentation heavily centered on modern rock music from the 1990s, as well as featured selected songs from the mid-1970s through the end of the 1980s as well as current product. This type of format was also in use in several other Clear Channel operations across the country, but has been discontinued at some of the radio stations during the past several years.

On August 4, 2008, Clear Channel placed the station's assets into an entity called the Aloha Station Trust in order to sell off the station. This was due to Clear Channel being above the ownership limits allowed by the Federal Communications Commission (FCC). These limits were imposed when Clear Channel was officially taken private by Bain Capital Partners on July 30, 2008. In December 2008, Clear Channel took back WMAX after Arbitron reassigned WMAX to the Muskegon market (though its signal favors Grand Rapids more than Muskegon) and its sister station, WLDI in Fort Pierce, Florida, to its new market.

Legally, 96.1 is WMAX-FM, as the WMAX calls are used at a Catholic Christian radio station (not co-owned) at 1440 AM in Bay City, Michigan. In 1922, the WMAX call sign was used by a station in Ann Arbor, Michigan. From circa 1956–1986, the WMAX calls were used by AM 1480 in Grand Rapids. WMAX was an adult contemporary music station "Good MAX Music," until flipping to an all-news format in 1976. WMAX had a local news staff of 11 reporters, known as "NEWSRADIO 1480," before becoming a Christian talk/Gospel Music station in 1984. WMAX was reassigned from Grand Rapids to Kentwood when a new night-time directional array was added in 1984. WMAX later became a Contemporary Christian station, before becoming silent. AM 1480 became WGVU-AM in 1992, operated by Grand Valley State University. From 1992 to 1998, the WMAX call letters were used by an alternative rock 106.7 FM station in Rochester, New York.

Starting in June 2009, Clear Channel's Grand Rapids operations began making plans to change the format of the radio station into one carrying ESPN-provided sports programming and local/statewide play-by-play game commentary. The plan went into effect August 7, 2009, when WMAX-FM began "stunting" by simulcasting mainstream rock-oriented sister station WBFX. On August 17, 2009, at midnight, the stunting ended and the station switched to its current format of sports-oriented programming, with a large share of the programs originating from ESPN Radio.

The station is also a secondary affiliate of Fox Sports Radio and airs Colin Cowherd's syndicated sports program on middays. It is also the West Michigan affiliate of the Detroit Pistons. Clear Channel Communications became iHeartMedia in 2013.

On August 30, 2021, WMAX-FM rebranded as "96.1 The Game".

On October 9, 2023, WMAX-FM switched affiliation from ESPN Radio to Fox Sports Radio.

== Bronco Radio Network ==
Beginning September 5, 2009 the station started broadcasting Western Michigan University Broncos football and men's basketball games via the school's "Bronco Radio Network".

== Previous logo ==
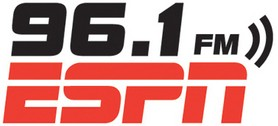
