= Gordon Deal =

American talk radio host

Gordon Deal is an American talk radio host for the nationally syndicated wake-up show This Morning, America's First News with Gordon Deal, previously called The Wall Street Journal This Morning. Prior to working at The Wall Street Journal, Deal worked at both WINS and WCBS in New York City as a writer and reporter. He also served as New York City bureau chief for Metro Networks (now Total Traffic) where his reports aired on WOR and WABC. Deal began his career in radio as a play-by-play sports announcer for Rutgers University. He has also been a public address announcer for the New York Knicks of the NBA and the New York Liberty of the WNBA. In 2012, he became the New York Giants PA Announcer at MetLife Stadium
