= WSMZ (AM) =

Radio station in Muskegon, Michigan

Coordinates: 43°8′5.1″N 86°15′41.2″W

- Muskegon, Michigan; United States
- Broadcast area: Muskegon, Michigan
- Frequency: 850 kHz (HD Radio)
- Branding: Smile FM

Programming
- Format: Contemporary Christian
- Network: Smile FM

Ownership
- Owner: Ed and Jennifer Czelada; (Smile FM)

History
- First air date: 1926
- Former call signs: WKBZ (1926–1999); WGVS (1999–2022)
- Call sign meaning: "Smile"

Technical information
- Licensing authority: FCC
- Facility ID: 33695
- Class: CP: D
- Power: 250 watts (STA & CP)

Links
- Public license information: Public file; LMS
- Website: smile.fm

WSMZ (850 kHz) is an AM radio station in Muskegon, Michigan. It is the oldest radio station in Muskegon. The station is part of the contemporary Christian-formatted Smile FM network.

== History ==
The station was first authorized on November 3, 1926, under the call sign WKBZ, to Karl L. Ashbacker in Ludington, Michigan. The call sign was randomly assigned from a sequential roster of available call letters. The station initially broadcast on 1170 kHz, moving to 1500 kHz in June 1927.

Following the establishment of the Federal Radio Commission (FRC), stations were initially issued a series of temporary authorizations starting on May 3, 1927. In addition, they were informed that if they wanted to continue operating, they needed to file a formal license application by January 15, 1928, as the first step in determining whether they met the new "public interest, convenience, or necessity" standard. On May 25, 1928, the FRC issued General Order 32, which notified 164 stations, including WKBZ, that "From an examination of your application for future license it does not find that public interest, convenience, or necessity would be served by granting it." However, the station successfully convinced the commission that it should remain licensed.

In March 1941, most of the stations on 1500 kHz were moved to 1490 kHz, with the implementation of the North American Regional Broadcasting Agreement. The station relocated to Muskegon in 1934, establishing studios in the Continental Hotel. (The Ashbackers later built another station in Ludington, starting up WKLA in 1944.)

In 1947, the station moved to 850 kHz. The Ashbackers owned WKBZ until December 1951, when Arch Shawd acquired the Ashbacker Radio Company. Shawd sold the station in 1958 to Walter Patterson, who sold his WKBZ Radio Corporation to Frederick Allman and Robert Richards in 1963. Reams Communications Corporation bought WKBZ in 1968 and owned it until 1986, when the station was sold to KBZ Broadcasting.

WKBZ and WKBZ-FM 95.3 in Whitehall were donated to Grand Valley State University by Robert Jewell and Daniel Thill in 1995; the university elected to sell the stations to WLC Communications, Inc., in early 1997. In November 1998, however, WLC returned WKBZ-AM-FM to Grand Valley State, which converted the stations to public radio as WGVS-AM-FM. (The WKBZ call letters moved to 1520 AM, which went silent in 2002, and are now on 1090 AM.)

On August 27, 2009, WGVU and WGVS flipped to an oldies format—a first for a public radio station. The station's playlist encompassed hits from the mid-1950s through the mid-1970s and featured many seldom-heard songs not typically played on commercial oldies stations, including some titles by local Michigan artists. Big band, traditional pop, and easy listening songs from the 1940s through the 1970s were featured on Sunday mornings during the Sunday Morning Standards program. Also airing on Sundays was the West Michigan Top 40 show, which counted down the songs on a historic local record chart from a given date.

In late 2021, Grand Valley State University announced that it would end the "Real Oldies" format and shut down WGVU and WGVS on January 7, 2022. The university planned to return the AM station licenses to the Federal Communications Commission (FCC) and sell their transmitter sites. WGVU-TV, WGVU-FM, and WGVS-FM were not affected by the shutdown of the AM stations.

Effective June 28, 2022, Grand Valley State sold WGVS to Ed and Jennifer Czelada's Smile FM for $25,000. Prior to the sale of WGVS to Smile FM (and them changing the callsign to WSMZ), the old WGVS broadcast facility was dismantled and the land was sold, forcing Smile FM to pursue a STA to get the station back on air and also a new transmitter site.

WSMZ has operated on a STA at 250 watts non directional 24/7 from a remote facility on private property northwest of Muskegon since 2022. WSMZ also has a construction permit for a new transmitter site on the east side of Muskegon off Olthoff drive, with the station becoming a daytime-only AM, shutting down at night to protect clear-channel WKNR. The conversion to daytime only from 24-hour operation is allowed by the FCC only for class B stations (which WGVS was prior to shutdown) to downgrade to class D.
