= WLHT-FM =

Radio station in Grand Rapids, Michigan

Coordinates: 43.033°N 85.696°W

- Grand Rapids, Michigan; United States
- Broadcast area: Grand Rapids, Michigan
- Frequency: 95.7 MHz (HD Radio)
- Branding: Mix 95.7

Programming
- Format: Hot adult contemporary
- Subchannels: HD2: Simulcast of WSLI-FM Smile FM (contemporary Christian)
- Affiliations: Compass Media Networks

Ownership
- Owner: Townsquare Media; (Townsquare Media of Grand Rapids, Inc.)
- Sister stations: WFGR; WGRD-FM; WNWZ; WTRV

History
- First air date: February 26, 1962 (as WKLW)
- Former call signs: WKLW (1962–1965); WZZM-FM (1965–1977); WZZR-FM (1977–1984)
- Call sign meaning: "Light music" (previous format)

Technical information
- Facility ID: 37457
- Class: B
- ERP: 40,000 watts
- HAAT: 168 meters (551 ft)
- Translators: HD2: 99.9 W260CQ (Plainfield Township); HD2: 102.5 W273CI (Grand Haven)

Links
- Webcast: Listen live
- Website: mix957gr.com

WLHT-FM (95.7 MHz) is a hot adult contemporary music formatted radio station in Grand Rapids, Michigan, owned by Townsquare Media. WLHT's studios are located on Ottawa Avenue Northwest in downtown Grand Rapids, while its transmitter is located in Comstock Park.

WLHT-FM is also licensed for HD Radio operation, and features Smile FM music from WSLI-FM on its HD-2 subchannel.

== WKLW, WZZM-FM, and WZZR ==
The station signed on the same day as WOOD-FM (now WSRW-FM) in 1962. The original call letters of 95.7 FM were WKLW. In the mid-1960s, the station came into common ownership with WZZM-TV Channel 13 and became WZZM-FM, an example of the call letters and rounded frequency number both forming ambigrams as "96 WZZM". By 1967, the station was block-programmed, with country music in the morning, Top 40 music in afternoon drive, and middle of the road music at night. Then, in 1968, WZZM-FM converted its format to full-time Top 40. WZZM-FM "Z96" was one of the first FM Top 40s in Michigan to pose a serious challenge to its AM competition: by the end of 1970 it was ahead of WLAV (1340 AM) and WGRD (1410 AM) in several dayparts, including at night, when the AM competition either had poor signals or was off the air, and on the weekends.

In 1971, WZZM-FM picked up a serious competitor when WGRD added an FM signal at 97.9 (formerly WXTO). The reborn WGRD was an instant success. WZZM reacted by evolving its format into a Top 40/AOR hybrid better known as CHR, and then in 1972, into a Top 40/oldies hybrid. The station gained a "second wind" of sorts and posted a #1 12+ Arbitron showing in Grand Rapids in the summer of 1973, but ratings quickly dropped off again afterwards. In 1977, WZZM-FM changed its calls to WZZR and adopted the name Rockradio Z96 (and using the slogan The Wizard of Rock 'n' Roll). WZZR continued to struggle through the rest of the 1970s and into the 1980s, shifting back and forth between Top 40/"adult contemporary. In 1983, WZZR tweaked its format from CHR into a "Rock of the Eighties" format, but ratings remained low.

== WLHT ==
In 1984, WZZR became WLHT and switched to adult contemporary. Once again, 95.7 FM was a pioneer in the market in terms of trying a new format, and once again, its pioneering spirit led to success and acclaim. In 1998 WLHT was named AC station of the year at the Marconi Award ceremonies. Two years later Regent Communications (now Townsquare Media) purchased the station, along with sister stations WGRD-FM, WNWZ, and WTRV.

On April 14, 2006, husband and wife morning team Dave Jagger and Geri Jarvis announced that they would host their final morning show on April 21 after twenty years on the air on W-Lite. They were replaced April 24, 2006, by Denis Pryor and Nanette in morning drive. At the same time, the station re-branded from "95.7 W-Lite" to "Lite Rock 95.7" (but reverted to the "W-Lite" name afterward). WLHT's music rotation also became slightly brighter and more rock-based than previously.

=== Shift to hot AC ===
By August 2009, WLHT had moved its format toward hot AC (of which WMAX-FM used to carry until 2008), and its previous mainstream AC format had shifted to sister station WTRV, which previously had aired a MOR/soft AC mix. As a result, WLHT-FM had been leaning adult top 40 until the station dropped AC in 2009 (a similar situation done at adult top 40-leaning ACs such as WNIC in Detroit). Also in 2009, former WOOD-TV news personality Gerry Barnaby took over the morning show.

On October 11, 2010, WLHT re-branded as Channel 95-7 and completed its shift to a hot AC format. The format change brought changes to the station's on-air lineup as well. Channel 95-7 added The Kidd Kraddick Morning Show, giving the station a syndicated morning show for the first time in its history, but was cancelled in October 2012 to be replaced by former Madison, WI morning show "Connie and Fish." - and midday host Kim Carson (a veteran of Detroit radio) moved to WTRV, with Wendy Reed, who had formerly held the same shift at WTRV, taking her place.

On November 6, 2017, WLHT-FM rebranded as Mix 95.7, with no change in format.

== Sources ==
- Michiguide.com - WLHT-FM History
