= WSNX-FM =

Michigan radio station

- Muskegon, Michigan; United States
- Broadcast area: Muskegon-Grand Rapids-Holland
- Frequency: 104.5 MHz (HD Radio)
- Branding: 104.5 SNX

Programming
- Format: Top 40 (CHR)
- Affiliations: Premiere Networks

Ownership
- Owner: iHeartMedia, Inc.; (iHM Licenses, LLC)
- Sister stations: WBCT; WBFX; WMAX-FM; WOOD; WSRW-FM; WTKG

History
- First air date: November 18, 1971
- Former call signs: WQWQ-FM (1971–1986); WSNX (1986)
- Call sign meaning: For the station's former "Sunny" branding

Technical information
- Licensing authority: FCC
- Facility ID: 24644
- Class: B
- ERP: 32,000 watts
- HAAT: 189 meters (620 ft)
- Transmitter coordinates: 43.204°N 86.029°W

Links
- Public license information: Public file; LMS
- Webcast: Listen live (via iHeartRadio)
- Website: 1045snx.iheart.com

WSNX-FM (104.5 MHz "104-5 SNX") is a top 40 (CHR) radio station located in Muskegon, in Western Michigan with the station serving the Grand Rapids metropolitan area and the rural areas to the north and west. It is one of two top 40/CHR stations in Grand Rapids along with WHTS. The studios are located at 77 Monroe Center in Downtown Grand Rapids while its transmitter is located near Sherman Blvd and Ensley Rd outside of Muskegon.

== History ==
What is now WSNX began life as beautiful music station WQWQ (the "Q" stood for "Quality") in 1971. Goodrich Radio Marketing purchased the frequency in 1984, and quickly changed the beautiful music format to Top 40 and used the moniker "Sunny-FM" on-air. (The WQWQ calls and easy-listening format moved to 101.7 FM and continued there until the station became WMRR.) Goodrich Radio located the studios at 875 East Summit in Norton Shores, just outside Muskegon. The antenna was upgraded to get a city-grade signal into Grand Rapids. Sunny FM on-air personalities in the 1980s included Jim Biggins, J.J. Duling, Diamond Dave, Jo Jo Girard, Mark Frost, Ranger Bob and T.R. McCoy.

WSNX moved to Grand Rapids (at 2610 28th Street) in 1996, where it was occupying the same offices of sister stations WODJ and WKWM. It would also drop the "Sunny FM" moniker and simply go by "104.5 WSNX". It was around this time that the CHR-formatted station added an apparent hip-hop or urban feel musically, as well as adding local music.

During the late 1980s, WSNX was one of several competing CHR stations in the area, with the dominant WGRD and WKLQ. By the mid-1990s, WGRD had switched to alternative rock and WKLQ had long since switched to album-oriented rock, and the CHR battle was between WSNX and Federated Media's adult-leaning "Mix 96" (WAKX). In early 1997, Clear Channel purchased WAKX from Federated Media and flipped it to "Continuous Hit Music I-96" as WVTI. Goodrich aimed WSNX directly at "I-96", competing with them on the air and through promotions. The station identified itself as "Grand Rapids' Hottest Music, 104.5 WSNX" or just SNX in jingle form.

WSNX moved again to downtown Grand Rapids after it was purchased by Clear Channel Radio in September 1999, and took the "Continuous Hit Music" moniker and a slightly more mainstream, though still rhythmic-leaning, CHR format, as WAKX was retooled as a hot AC to compete with WLHT. In 2006, the station dropped the "Continuous Hit Music" slogan, and the point from "104.5", with the station simply branding itself as "104-5 WSNX", virtually the same time when rival WHTS was launched. In 2011, the station started using the "West Michigan's Party Station" slogan, but this is not used on-air and only used on the station's website.

WSNX was the first radio station in both the Grand Rapids and Muskegon markets to broadcast in HD Radio, as it does today. Its HD2 subchannel originally carried the Dance Top 40 "Club Phusion" format, but switched, in late 2009, to a format known as "The Beat". By 2014, this changed to a 24/7 Black comedy format, and then, during September 2022, all HD2 services were discontinued.

== Jingles and imaging ==
The late 1990s saw WSNX use 3 jingle packages from Reelworld. KDWB 1996, KDWB 1997, and WZPL. In 2001, the station used N2 Kiss, Dallas. This started a long 10-year jingle deal that would see WSNX use every KDWB jingle package N2 Effect released. The deal ended in 2010, and WSNX has not used any jingles since.

The station's imaging voices were Brian James until 1999, then Saint John until 2007, and Doctor Dave from 2007–present.
