= Leroy Township, Ingham County, Michigan =

Leroy Township, Michigan
- Civil township
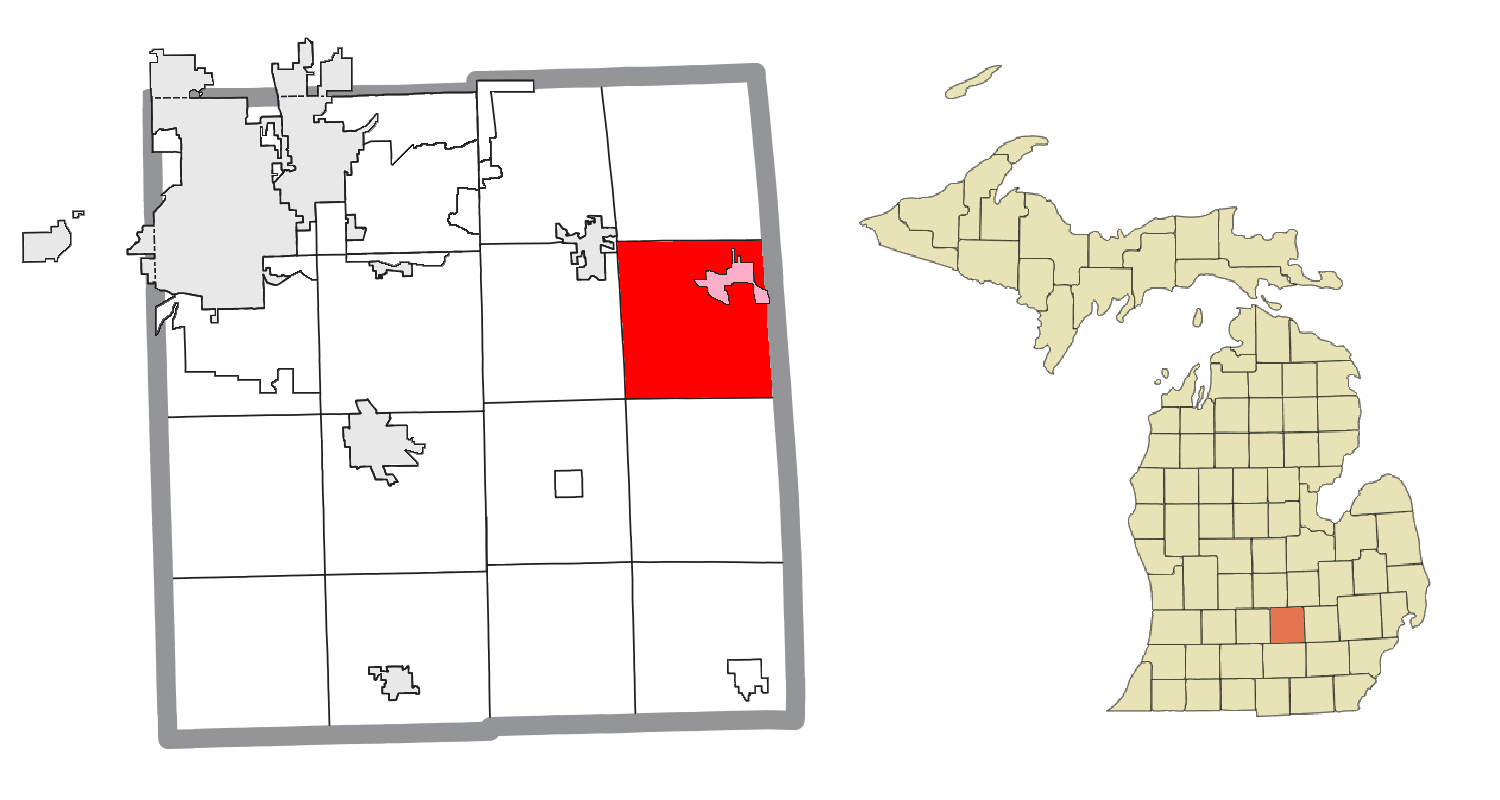
- Location within Ingham County (red) and the administered village of Webberville (pink)

- Location within the state of Michigan Location within the United States
- Coordinates: 42°39′39″N 84°11′28″W
- Country: United States
- State: Michigan
- County: Ingham
- Established: 1840

Government
  - Supervisor: Earl Griffes
  - Clerk: Wilma Whitehead

Area
  - Total: 34.21 sq mi (88.60 km^{2})
  - Land: 34.13 sq mi (88.40 km^{2})
  - Water: 0.081 sq mi (0.21 km^{2})
- Elevation: 889 ft (271 m)

Population (2020)
  - Total: 3,791
  - Density: 111.1/sq mi (42.88/km^{2})
- Time zone: UTC-5 (Eastern (EST))
  - Summer (DST): UTC-4 (EDT)
- ZIP code(s): 48892 (Webberville); 48895 (Williamston)
- Area code: 517
- FIPS code: 26-47080
- GNIS feature ID: 1626608
- Website: Official website

Leroy Township is a civil township of Ingham County in the U.S. state of Michigan. The population was 3,791 at the 2020 census.

== History ==
Leroy Township was established in 1840.

== Communities ==
- The village of Webberville is in the northeast corner of the township, just northeast of the junction of M-43 and M-52 with I-96.

== Geography ==
According to the United States Census Bureau, the township has a total area of 34.21 square miles (88.60 km^{2}), of which 34.13 square miles (88.40 km^{2}) is land and 0.08 square miles (0.207 km^{2}) (0.23%) is water.

== Demographics ==
As of the census of 2000, there were 3,653 people, 1,329 households, and 1,015 families residing in the township. The population density was 106.8 inhabitants per square mile (41.2/km^{2}). There were 1,409 housing units at an average density of 41.2 per square mile (15.9/km^{2}). The racial makeup of the township was 97.04% White, 0.49% African American, 0.41% Native American, 0.25% Asian, 0.05% Pacific Islander, 0.44% from other races, and 1.31% from two or more races. Hispanic or Latino of any race were 1.07% of the population.

There were 1,329 households, out of which 39.5% had children under the age of 18 living with them, 60.0% were married couples living together, 12.0% had a female householder with no husband present, and 23.6% were non-families. 18.5% of all households were made up of individuals, and 6.4% had someone living alone who was 65 years of age or older. The average household size was 2.75 and the average family size was 3.11.

In the township the population was spread out, with 28.7% under the age of 18, 8.6% from 18 to 24, 31.2% from 25 to 44, 22.4% from 45 to 64, and 9.2% who were 65 years of age or older. The median age was 35 years. For every 100 females, there were 99.7 males. For every 100 females age 18 and over, there were 95.6 males.

The median income for a household in the township was $45,234, and the median income for a family was $50,417. Males had a median income of $41,924 versus $29,153 for females. The per capita income for the township was $19,552. About 5.8% of families and 8.0% of the population were below the poverty line, including 10.4% of those under age 18 and 8.7% of those age 65 or over.
