= Michigan Association of Broadcasters =

- Abbreviation: MAB
- Purpose: Broadcasting
- Headquarters: Lansing, Michigan
- Region served: Michigan
- Official language: English
- Website: MichMAB.com

The Michigan Association of Broadcasters represents radio and television broadcasters across the U.S. state of Michigan. It gives out yearly awards to both of these categories, including "Lifetime Achievement", "Hall of Fame", and "Broadcast Excellence Awards."

== Leadership ==
- Peter Tanz (Chairman 2017-2018)
- Gary Baxter (Vice Chair/Chair-Elect 2017-2018)
- Zoe Burdine-Fly (Secretary/Treasurer 2017-2018)
- Stephen Marks (at-large Director 2017-2018)
- Debbie Kenyon (Immediate Past Chair 2017-2018)
- Karole L. White (President/CEO)
- A. Thomas Hahn (Executive Vice-President/Finance)
