= WGRD-FM =

Rock radio station in Grand Rapids, Michigan

Coordinates: 42.796°N 85.649°W

- Grand Rapids, Michigan; United States
- Broadcast area: Grand Rapids metropolitan area
- Frequency: 97.9 MHz (HD Radio)
- Branding: 97.9 WGRD

Programming
- Format: Mainstream Rock
- Affiliations: Compass Media Networks

Ownership
- Owner: Townsquare Media; (Townsquare Media of Grand Rapids, Inc.)
- Sister stations: WFGR, WLHT-FM, WNWZ, WTRV

History
- First air date: August 1, 1962
- Former call signs: WXTO (1962–1971)
- Call sign meaning: Grand Rapids Daytime (when WGRD AM was a daytime only station)

Technical information
- Licensing authority: FCC
- Facility ID: 55650
- Class: B
- ERP: 13,000 watts
- HAAT: 180 meters (590 ft)

Links
- Public license information: Public file; LMS
- Webcast: Listen live
- Website: wgrd.com

WGRD-FM (97.9 FM) is a commercial radio station in Grand Rapids, Michigan. It is owned by Townsquare Media and it broadcasts a mainstream rock format. It is the flagship station of The Free Beer and Hot Wings Show, a syndicated comedy and talk morning program. WGRD's studios and offices are on Ottawa Avenue NW in Grand Rapids.

WGRD-FM has an effective radiated power (ERP) of 13,000 watts. The transmitter is on 92nd Street SE at High Point Drive in Cutlerville.

== History ==
=== College years and Top 40 ===
The station signed on the air on August 1, 1962. Its original call sign was WXTO, owned by the Roman Catholic Diocese of Grand Rapids. It was a college radio station operated by Aquinas College, which gave students training in broadcasting and also aired Catholic religious programs.

It was sold to a commercial broadcasting operation, which also owned WGRD 1410 AM in Grand Rapids and WTRU 1600 AM in Muskegon. Regional Broadcasters, Inc. took full control of the station in 1971 and changed its call letters to WGRD-FM. The station's transmitter and tower remained on the Aquinas College campus until 1974. WGRD 1410 AM was a daytime-only station, hence the call letters, which stood for "Grand Rapids Daytime".

In 1971, WGRD 1410 AM, which had had a Top 40 music format in place since 1959, was struggling in the ratings against pop-rock competitors WLAV 1340 AM and 95.7 WZZM-FM (then known as "Z96", now WLHT-FM). Management decided to move the struggling Top 40 format onto its FM station as "The New 98 Rock, WGRD-FM". That made the FM stereo station the primary frequency while having the AM continue to simulcast. The newly revamped WGRD-FM quickly became the dominant Top 40 station in the market until the 1984 launch of WKLQ.

During the mid-1970s, WGRD was frequently the #1 station (12+) in the Grand Rapids market. In the 1979 Fall Arbitron ratings period, WGRD was on top with a 19 share. By 1985, the station was known as "98 Rock, WGRD". Throughout the mid and late 1980s, both WGRD and WKLQ battle for competition. WGRD earned a 12.2 share (12+) in the Summer 1986 Arbitron ratings, that was helped by the popular "98 Rock Morning Show" hosted by Johnny "Big John" Howell, Robert "Radar" Shroll, and Jennifer Stephens, but WGRD fell out the top spot when WKLQ dominated the ratings in the Fall 1986 ratings. KLQ would continue to dominate into 1987 but remained steady in the Top 5 by 1988. That same year in 1988, the station dropped the "98 Rock" brand and went with the branding "98 WGRD". Two years later in 1990, WGRD became the only CHR station in the Grand Rapids market following KLQ's CHR dropout that same year.

=== Alternative and Mainstream Rock ===
By the summer of 1994, WGRD-FM's station moniker was "Grand Rapids #1 Hit Music Station! 98 WGRD". But its Top 40 sound found increasing competition from other area radio stations with similar formats. By the following year in 1995, WGRD-FM had lost significant market share to 104.5 WSNX in Muskegon, which had flipped from adult contemporary music to Top 40/CHR. WSNX was programmed by former WGRD music director J.J. Duling and began to eclipse WGRD in the area radio ratings. During that year, WGRD began phasing in popular alternative rock and modern AC songs to the playlist. Over the next several months, the Top 40 hits were heard less and less, with WGRD beginning to promote itself as alternative rock.

In 2000, WGRD was acquired by Regent Broadcasting, which changed its name to Townsquare Media ten years later. In August 2010 a reunion of more than 60 former WGRD staff members was held in Grand Rapids which included market legend Bruce Grant, the original program director from 1948, and dozens of other personalities from the AM 1410/FM 97.9 history. During 2010, WGRD began to shift its focus from alternative rock to mainstream rock. This was due to a format hole in the market being created by longtime rock station 94.5 WKLQ switching to sports talk. WGRD's target demographic is Men ages 18–34 and a secondary of Men 25-54 (Arbitron demographics).

=== Free Beer and Hot Wings ===
The Free Beer and Hot Wings Show is WGRD's comedy/talk wake-up program. It is syndicated by Compass Media Networks and heard across the U.S., mostly on rock stations. It began airing on WGRD in 2004.

The cast consists of five members: Gregg "Free Beer" Daniels, Chris "Hot Wings" Michels, Steve McKiernan, Kelly Cheesborough and Maitlynn Mossolle. The show is now syndicated in 38 markets throughout the United States.

== Sources ==
- WGRD Website
- Michiguide.com - WGRD-FM History
