= WFMG (disambiguation) =

WFMG may refer to:

- WFMG, a radio station (101.3 FM) licensed to Richmond, Indiana
- WLUB, a radio station (105.7 FM) licensed to Augusta, Georgia, which held the call sign WFMG from 1984 to 1985
- WGHN-FM, a radio station (92.1 FM) licensed to Grand Haven, Michigan, which held the call sign WFMG from 1976 to 1983
- WGFX, a radio station (104.5 FM) licensed to Gallatin, Tennessee, which held the call sign WFMG from 1960 to 1971
