= Grand Haven State Park =

Park in Michigan, USA

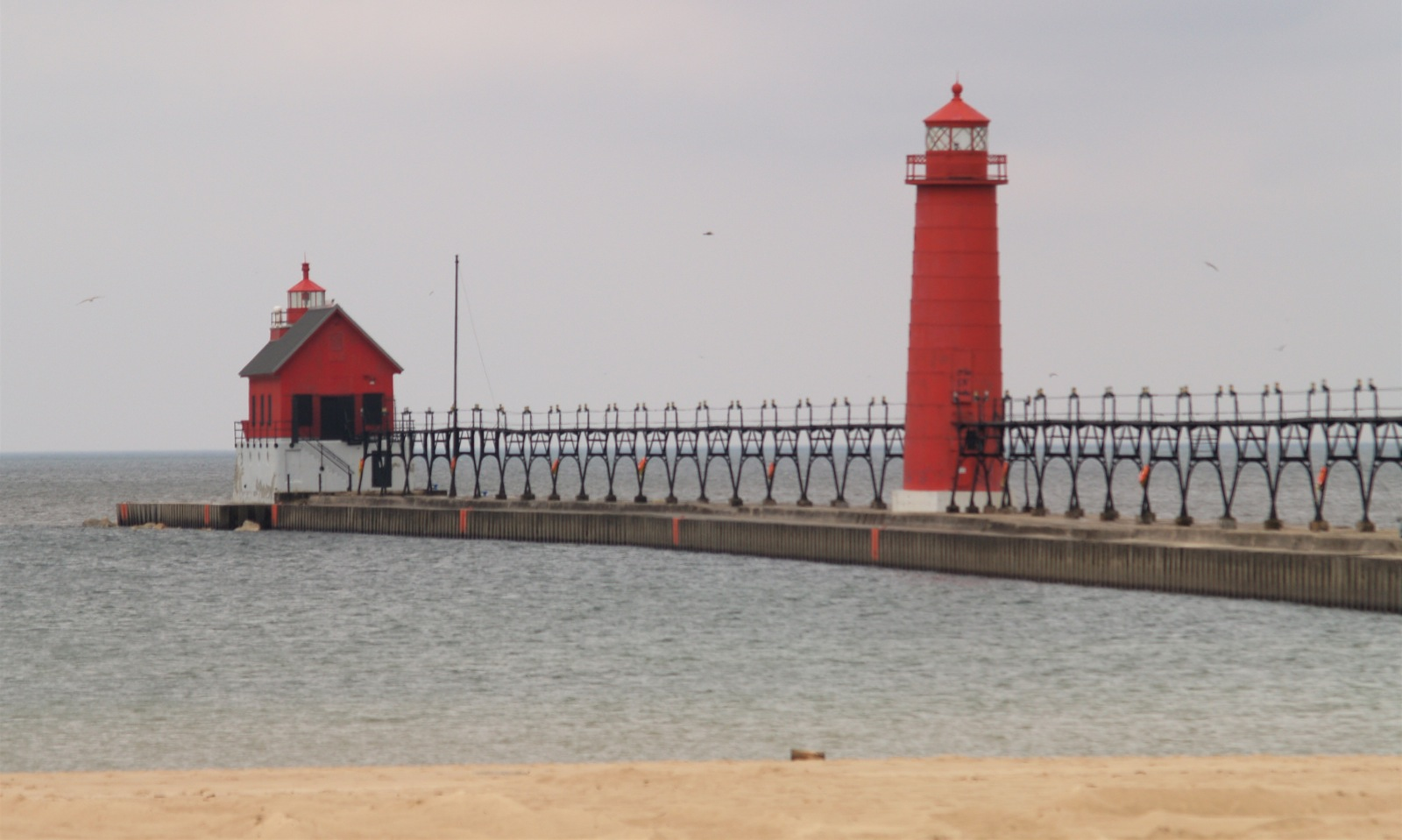
- Grand Haven Lighthouses

- Location within Michigan Location within the United States
- Location: Grand Haven, Michigan, United States
- Coordinates: 43°03′13″N 86°14′47″W
- Area: 48 acres (19 ha)
- Elevation: 591 feet (180 m)
- Established: 1920
- Administrator: Michigan Department of Natural Resources
- Designation: Michigan state park
- Website: Official website

Grand Haven State Park is a public recreation area on the shores Lake Michigan on the south side of the mouth of the Grand River and harbor in Grand Haven, Michigan. The state park encompasses 48 acres (19 ha) consisting entirely of beach sand. It features camping and beach activities along with scenic views of the Grand Haven South Pierhead Entrance Light and Grand Haven South Pierhead Inner Light.

== Features ==
The park is bordered by Lake Michigan to the west, the Grand River on the north, and City Beach to the south. A large pier next to the state park supports the harbor's entrance light and inner lighthouse (pictured at right). The pier connects to a boardwalk that extends approximately one mile upstream toward the commercial district of Grand Haven. The beach and state park were created by the interruption of the littoral drift of sand along the coast caused by the navigation structure which was installed to protect the entrance to the harbor.

== History ==
The park was among the 13 parks created in 1920 after the Michigan State Parks Commission was established in 1919. The park (popularly called "The Oval") was originally a 35-acre public beach that had been purchased by the city for $1,000. In 1920, the twenty-two acres closest to the pier were deeded from the city to the state for $1.00 for use as a state park, with the acreage to the south retained as City Beach.

== Activities and amenities ==
In addition to swimming and other beach activities, the park offers a 174-site campground, rental house, fishing pier, picnicking area, and playground.
