= Coast Guard Day =

United States commemoration

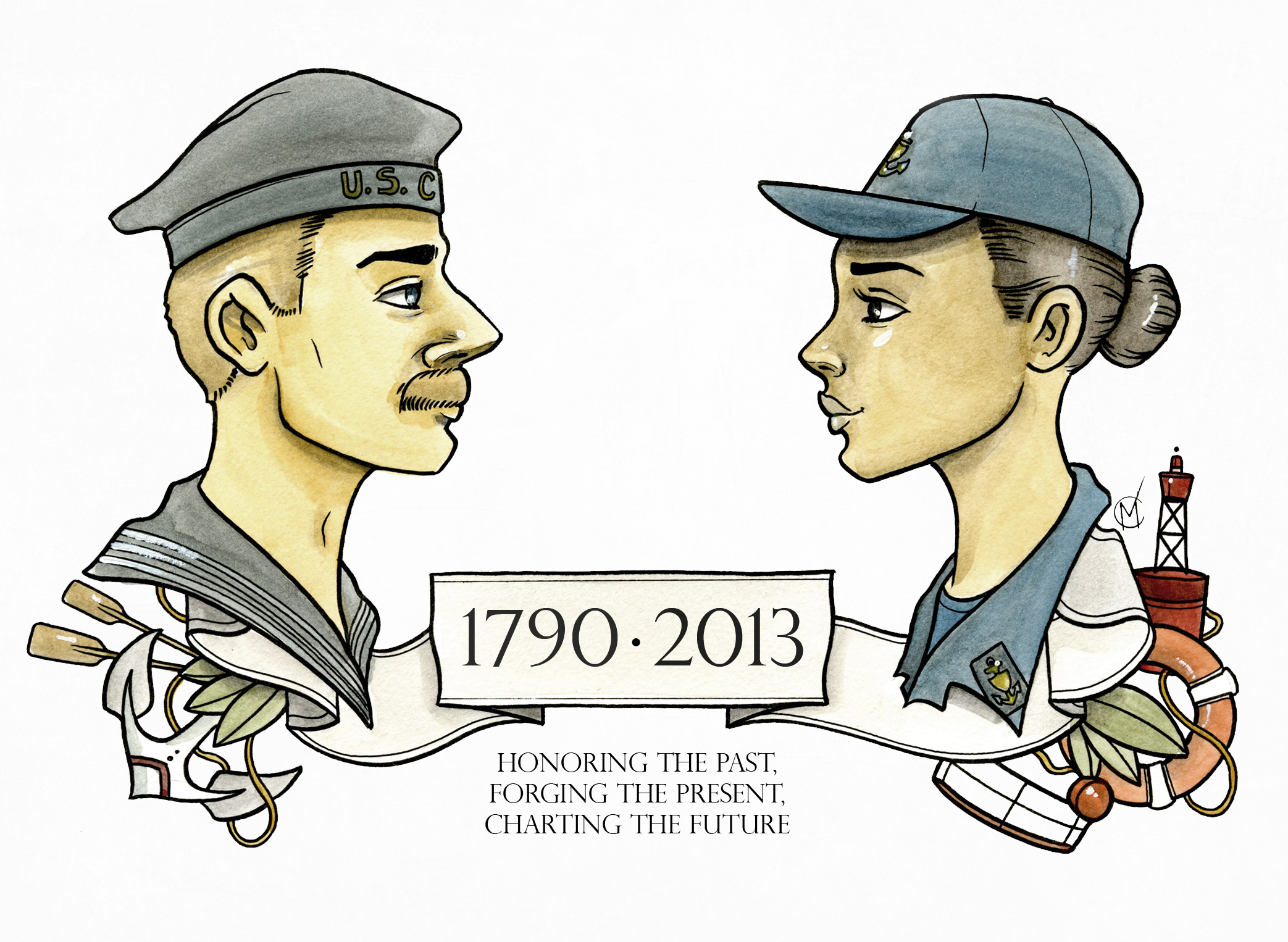
- A 2013 drawing by a U.S. Coast Guardsman to commemorate that year's Coast Guard Day.
- Also called: "USCG Day", "C.G. Day"
- Observed by: U.S. citizens, U.S. Coast Guardsmen
- Type: Cultural
- Celebrations: Festivals
- Date: August 4
- Next time: August 4, 2026
- Frequency: annual

Coast Guard Day is held every August 4 to commemorate the founding of the United States Coast Guard as the Revenue-Marine on August 4, 1790, by then-Secretary of the Treasury Alexander Hamilton. On that date, U.S. Congress, guided by Hamilton, authorized the building of a fleet of the first ten Revenue Service cutters, whose responsibility would be enforcement of the first tariff laws enacted by the U.S. Congress under the U.S. Constitution.

== Background ==
The U.S. Coast Guard received its present name through an act of the U.S. Congress signed into law by U.S. President Woodrow Wilson on January 28, 1915 that merged the Revenue Cutter Service with the U.S. Life-Saving Service, and provided the nation with a single maritime service dedicated to saving life at sea and enforcing the nation's maritime laws.

The U.S. Coast Guard began to maintain the country's maritime aids to navigation, including operating U.S. lighthouses, when President Franklin Roosevelt announced plans to transfer of the U.S. Lighthouse Service to the Coast Guard in May 1939. Congress approved the plan effective 1 July 1939. On 16 July 1946, Congress permanently transferred the Department of Commerce Bureau of Marine Inspection and Navigation to the Coast Guard, thereby placing merchant marine licensing and merchant vessel safety under Coast Guard regulation.

After 177 years in the Treasury Department, the Coast Guard was transferred to the newly formed Department of Transportation effective April 1, 1967. As a result of the terrorist attacks of September 11, 2001, the U.S. Coast Guard was transferred to the new U.S. Department of Homeland Security in 2003.

== History ==
Coast Guard Day is primarily an internal activity for active duty and reserve Coast Guardsmen, civilian employees, retirees, auxiliarists, and dependents, but it does have a significant share of interest outside the service. U.S. Coast Guard units throughout the United States usually plan picnics and informal sport competitions together with family and friends on Coast Guard Day. In addition to celebrating their own day every year, U.S. Coast Guardsmen also participate as equal partners in Armed Forces Day activities. Grand Haven, Michigan, also known by act of Congress as "Coast Guard City, USA", annually sponsors the Coast Guard Festival the week of August 4.

== See also ==
- Fleet Week

== Notes ==
=== References cited ===
- Section 409, Public Law 105–383
- "Coast Guard Timeline of Events". Complete Timeline. U.S. Coast Guard Historian's Office.
- "U.S Coast Guard Missions". History, Heritage & Traditions. U.S. Coast Guard Historian's Office.
- Krietemeyer, George E. (2000). The Coast Guardsman's Manual (9th ed.). Annapolis: Naval Institute Press. ISBN 1-55750-468-7.
- Johnson, Robert Irwin (1987). Guardians of the Sea, History of the United States Coast Guard, 1915 to the Present. Naval Institute Press, Annapolis. ISBN 978-0-87021-720-3.
- King, Irving H. (1996). The Coast Guard Expands, 1865–1915: New Roles, New Frontiers. Naval Institute Press, Annapolis. ISBN 1-55750-458-X.
