= Grand Haven Musical Fountain =

American synchronized display of water and lights

Coordinates: 43.06603°N 86.23782°W

The Grand Haven Musical Fountain is a synchronized display of water and lights in Grand Haven, Michigan located on Dewey Hill on the north shore of the Grand River. Each 25 to 30 minute show runs nightly at dark from Memorial Day through Labor Day, with Friday and Saturday shows that run during the months of May and September.

Each nightly show features a particular theme, from Sci-Fi Night to Country Night, with each show featuring a variety of choreographed songs that fit that night's theme. Additionally, special shows including a patriotic theme every July 4, a program saluting the United States Coast Guard runs yearly during the Coast Guard Festival in August, and other specialty one-time shows throughout each season. The fountain, which is owned by the city of Grand Haven, draws an annual average of 100,000 people.

== Construction ==
The fountain was the brainchild of Dr. William "Bill" Creason, a longtime resident, dentist, and former mayor of Grand Haven. The fountain was modeled after the Przystawic Musical Fountain Show, which Bill saw in Germany while providing dentistry for the US Navy after World War II.

Designed by a local engineer, William Morris Booth II (who is also the patent holder), volunteers built the fountain for an estimated $50,000 in 1962, when it was the world largest musical fountain of its kind until The Fountains of Bellagio opened at the Bellagio Resort in Las Vegas in 1998. The Grand Haven fountain's first show was May 30, 1963.

== Function ==
=== Water ===
==== Static ====
The fountain consists mainly of seven water formations known as "Modules" which are grouped in even and odd segments (known as "As'" and "Bs'", respectively), with the same formations in each. Each Module contains 4 separate sets of "Rings", which are upward facing nozzles concentrically placed in an arc. Each Ring has a varying diameter (Named Rings 1, 3, 4, and 5, with Ring 2 having been repurposed for another water feature).

In the original configuration, two "Curtains" were present: a series of hundreds of small nozzles placed in the front and back of the fountain which presented a wall appearance. However, the "Back" Curtain was removed in 2017 so that the valve could be reused for another water feature known as the "Wave" during a series of upgrades done by students from Grand Valley State University.

Although not part of the original design, a feature that is not one of the basic Modules is the "Peacock", which is a vertical arc consisting of 12 nozzles facing outwards near the back of the fountain. When the valves are fully open, the Peacock has a fan-like appearance.

Another original water feature is the "Spout", also known as the "Voice". The Spout is a single fire hose nozzle placed vertically in the center of the fountain, and is used to illustrate the "Voice of the Fountain" during shows. The maximum height of the Spout is 125 feet.

Two other fire hose nozzles known as the "Bazookas" are aimed at an angle from each end of the fountain facing inwards. These are plumbed together to create an arch appearance.

The "Candelabras" are set of six nozzles set at a forty-five degree angle in two groups, three on each side, facing inwards. There is a Candelabra in front of each Module, centered.

Each water feature with the exception of the Wave has different heights of water, known as "Levels" 1–5. This is achieved by opening each valve different amounts.

Originally, even and odd modules were plumbed together, but were later separated for additional options. In the modern configuration, every Ring of each Module can be controlled entirely independently.

===== Dynamic =====
Dynamic water features include the "Sweeps", which are a set of small nozzles on the left and right of every Module. Each sweep is mounted on a special patented pivot that allows it to oscillate left and right. The Sweeps can be configured to sway together or opposed, have two different outside dead zones to limit their total movement, and have nine separate speeds. The Sweeps have five different levels of height the same as the static features.

Two other water features are the "Helix" and the "Wave", which were installed in 2017 as a part of an ongoing collaboration between Grand Valley State University and the Fountain Committee. The Helix is a set of four nozzles placed upwards on a rotating turntable with a slight deviation from vertical, so that the turntable spins under the thrust from the water from the nozzles. This rotation gives it the profile of a helix, similar to that of DNA. The Helix also has five heights, however due to the reduced speed and visibility, choreographers who program the fountain rarely use a height below four. The Wave is the most complex of all the water features, with 50 nozzles placed in a row facing upwards along the back of the fountain. Although the software used to program the fountain has presets for controlling the Wave in groups of seven for each module, full control of each one of the 50 valves in still able to be called separately. This allows the Wave to have over 500 unique combinations. Additionally, although valves in the Wave are digital, with a single height on or off, there also is a mode named the "Firework", where a valve or set of valves will give a short burst of water giving the short burst similar to a firework, which it is named after.

The most recent addition to the Grand Haven Musical fountain is the "Doves". The Doves are a set of two fan-like arrays of seven nozzles facing upwards on the left and right sides of the fountain. Although they have five levels similar to the other features, they also have a hidden feature. If called in the software for the valve for the Doves to open straight to Level 5, as opposed to any other height, they will begin to rotate clockwise and are an additional dynamic water feature. Designed, tested, and installed in 2022 by five senior engineering students from Grand Valley State University, along with Terry Stevens, an affiliate professor of engineering and the City of Grand Haven's musical fountain engineer, the Doves were installed as part of the Fountains 60th Anniversary.

=== Lighting ===
When the fountain was first built in 1962, the lighting was repurposed lighting from the Muskegon Airport. This meant the colors were limited to red, blue, amber for each Module, which were controlled in As' and Bs' the same as the water. Along the Front Curtain were upward facing lights that could be red, blue, amber, or white, and the Back Curtain had yellow and green lights that alternated. This original lighting was eventually replaced with the first generation of LED lighting which provided 15 colors and the ability to fade and crossfade. This first generation of LED lighting was later replaced with the lighting currently in use: 43 Acclaim Lighting Rebel Drum 36-watt RGB light fixtures, and two Acclaim Lighting Dyna Drum HO 240-watt fixtures focused on the Spout. These lights, which shine from both the front and from beneath, provide more complete control, with the ability to light each Module and Dove separately, light the left and right sides of the Spout or Helix separately, or even control separate nozzles of the Peacock separately (two nozzles at a time). There is also "Backlighting", which is a series of lights on the back of fountain that give the ability to light features such as the Wave independently from the rest of the Modules. However, some combinations, including the backlights, must still be entered into the software used to program the fountain manually.

=== Programming and software ===
The original control system used an 8-bit CNC paper punched tape and a reel to reel audio tape player which used "pulses" recorded on one of the audio channels to advance the paper punch tape to the next fountain control code. The fountain command codes drove a control system that was primarily a wired wrapped custom relay panel.

In 1983 the fountain switched from punch tape to an Allen-Bradley PLC, allowing for better control over the valves and lighting. The new control system also introduced using a RadioShack TRS-80 Model 4 to program shows. Programmers were required to type special commands into a text editor, compile the show script, and then record it out through a 300 baud modem to a four track real-to-real tape unit. The maximum number of commands that could be sent to the fountain was 12 per a second. This process took on average over 200 hours to produce a single 20 minute performance.

Around 1995 the PLC was upgraded to an AB PLC-5.

In 2005, the audio source was converted to PC based .wav files with the playback software on the a personal computer sending the PLC the water and lighting commands.

In September 2006, a new PC based programming and playback system was introduced. The playback software and a custom choreography software were developed by Brad Boyink and Jim Swarts. The Grand Haven Musical Fountain Animated Choreographer was then released to the public to encourage the development of new shows and allowed programmers to visually choreograph the fountain.

In 2013, a group of Grand Valley State University students upgraded the PLC processor to an AB CompactLogix with a PanelView+ operator interface.

In 2017 the software was updated to take advantage of the new lighting and water effects, and was made freely downloadable as the Grand Haven Musical Fountain Animated Choreographer 2.0. The online choreographer was later discontinued due to the difficulty of obtaining licensing for music used by the public, and the difficulty of attempting to streamline music and shows.

Today, the Grand Haven Musical Fountain is choreographed by a group of volunteers who donate their time and talent to produce music and shows. Using the latest version of the software (v1.86), choreographing a typical song takes anywhere from 4 hours to 60 hours, depending on the song length and complexity of commands.

== Plumbing ==
- Width: 240 feet
- Water basin capacity: 40,000 gallons
- Pipe: 8,000 feet long ranging in size from ¼ inch to 16 inches
- Nozzles: 1,300 nozzles ranging from 3/16" to 1" in diameter, located in the basin
- Capacity: 40,000 gallon basin
- Water consumption: 4,000 gallons per minute
- Maximum height of spray: 125 feet

== Lighting system specifications ==
New RGB LED Lighting (Introduced 2013 Season)

- Uses 32 RGB fixtures projecting light from the front and underneath
- Maximum power consumption of 2,400 watts (averages under 1000 watts)
- LED lighting uses 98% less power and is twice as bright
- LED lights can change color at 1/1000 of a second
- LED lights can produce 16 million colors

Legacy Lighting

- 446 lights with a combined power consumption of 116,200 watts
- Six colors of lights are used and blended for patterns
- Response time for legacy lighting is 1/2 second for full brightness

== Sound system specifications ==
- (32) 18", 600 watt JBL subwoofers
- (12) High-frequency JBL horns (30"x 30"x 6' deep)
- (14) Power amplifiers (35,000 watts total)
- (4) Independent zones of control:
  - Equalization
  - Electronic signal distribution
  - Audio and GPI control supplied by an ENCO DAD professional broadcast audio playout system
  - Frequency dividing
  - Power level attenuation
- About a mile and a half of cable
- Total system output (at the shoreline) in excess of 130 dB
- Watts per channel: 12,000

== See also ==
- Cascade Falls (Jackson, Michigan)
