= WGHA =

- Grand Haven, Michigan; United States
- Frequency: 1370 kHz

Programming
- Language: Spanish
- Format: Regional Mexican

Ownership
- Owner: Will Tieman (operated by Cano's Broadcasting under time brokerage agreement; outright sale pending); (WGHN, Inc.)

History
- First air date: July 16, 1956
- Former call signs: WGHN (1956-2025)
- Call sign meaning: Grand HAven

Technical information
- Licensing authority: FCC
- Facility ID: 72104
- Class: D
- Power: 500 watts day 22 watts night
- Transmitter coordinates: 43°2′17″N 86°13′46″W
- Translator: 94.9 W235CM (Grand Haven)

Links
- Public license information: Public file; LMS

WGHA (1370 kHz) is an AM radio station licensed to Grand Haven, Michigan. The station broadcasts a regional Mexican format.

== History ==
WGHA signed on the air on July 16, 1956 as WGHN. The station was founded by Robert Runyon and Robert Kirby, former employees of WOOD radio and television in Grand Rapids. WGHN went through several ownership changes in the next decade. Over the years, the station also moved several times, from its original studios on Washington Avenue (above Grand Haven Jewelry) to Franklin Avenue to South Seventh Street; WGHN has been housed at its current location on South Harbor Street in Grand Haven since 1985.

WGHN-FM 92.1 was added on January 28, 1969. In 1976 the station changed its call sign to WFMG (that call sign is now used at 101.3 FM in Richmond, Indiana) and separated programming from its AM sister, airing an easy listening format while the AM station continued with a format of adult contemporary music and talk. After the stations were sold in 1983, the FM's call sign was changed back to WGHN-FM and the two stations resumed simulcasting, which continued until January 4, 2008.

== 2007-present: Sale and Changes ==
WGHN owners Bill Struyk, President and General Manager, and Ron Mass, Vice President (known on the air as "Ron Stevens"), announced in April 2007 that they were selling WGHN and WGHN-FM to Lansing-based businessman Will Tieman, owner of Michigan State University's Spartan Sports Network. Struyk told the Grand Haven Tribune that he and Mass were both ready for retirement (1). Despite speculation that Tieman would try to move WGHN out of Grand Haven to become a Muskegon- or Grand Rapids-market station, Tieman told The Muskegon Chronicle that he did not plan to make any major programming changes (see: "New owner plans to keep WGHN local," The Muskegon Chronicle, 8 May 2007) 1, nor would he immediately discontinue WGHN's University of Michigan sports broadcasts in favor of Michigan State sports.

In early January 2008, Will Tieman discontinued WGHN's simulcast of the FM signal and changed the format to ESPN Radio.

On May 25, 2018, WGHN changed its format from ESPN sports to oldies, branded as "Oldies 94.9".

On November 21, 2022, WGHN temporarily replaced its oldies format with WGHN-FM's adult contemporary format, due to WGHN-FM being off the air.

On September 12, 2023, WGHN dropped its simulcast with WGHN-FM and changed formats to album-oriented rock, branded as "94.9 The Channel".

In addition to Wolverines athletics, the station also aired Spring Lake High School football & basketball air in-season.

On May 9, 2025, Tieman agreed to sell WGHN and its FM translator to Cano's Broadcasting of Grand Rapids, owner of WMJH. Cano's immediately took over the station's operations under a time brokerage agreement, pending final FCC approval of the sale. The call letters were slightly modified to WGHA. "The Channel" is still streamed live on WGHN's Website.

== Sources ==
- Michiguide.com-WGHN History
