= Mulligan's Hollow Ski Bowl =

Ski area in Michigan, United States

Coordinates: 43.0564°N 86.2393°W

Mulligan's Hollow Ski Bowl is a family friendly, local ski hill situated in the dunes of Grand Haven, Michigan. It is located adjacent to the Tri-Cities YMCA. Originally built in 1960 through the help of volunteers, it has provided kids, teens, and families a local, comparatively inexpensive location to enjoy snow sports. In 2009, the day-to-day operations were handed from the City of Grand Haven to a new, volunteer organization named the Ski Bowl Association in an effort to remove the financial burden from the city's budget.

== Improvements ==
Volunteers, generous donors, and fundraisers have, over the decades, provided improvements to the hill. Rope tows, snow making equipment, a Sno-Cat, snowmobiles, warming hut (with outdoor fire pit), hillside sound system, and a first aid station are now part of the hill. Recent additions include terrain features for a snowboard park. As of the end of 2010, the hill maintained 5 tow ropes and 7 groomed runs.

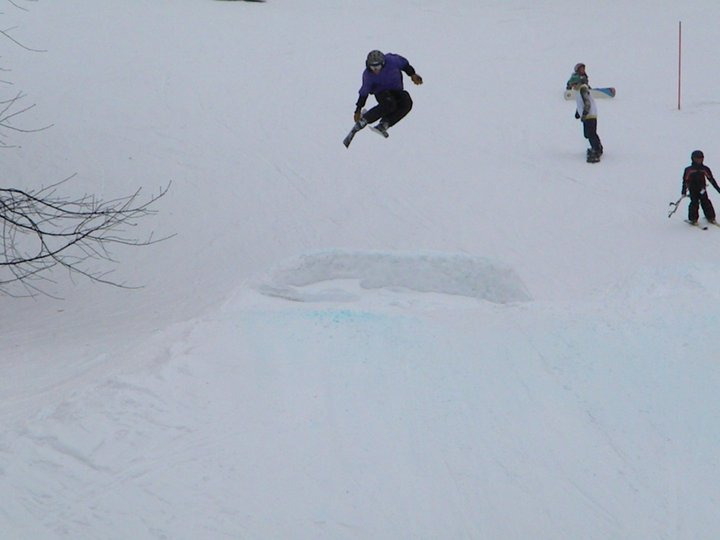
Local skier catching "Big Air" on one of the many jumps at Mulligan's Hollow.

== Ice Rink ==
The ice rink, located adjacent to the parking, is lit and available when outdoor temperatures allow for ice.

== Rental Equipment ==
Reliable Ski is providing ski and snowboard rental on site, but supplies are limited.

== Lessons ==
While the Ski Bowl does not have equipment to rent (see note above about local sport house), it does offer lessons in skiing and snowboarding. Lessons range from beginner to advanced and can be in a group setting or private. Various clinics for advanced techniques are often available as well.

== Community Events ==
During the summer, the Ski Bowl is sometimes used for community events, such as Kids Day at the Coast Guard Festival. In past years, the hillside has also been the site of the occasional concert.

== Future Plans ==
Recent site plans call for relocating of an existing softball field to offer more parking and improvements to driveways to allow better mass transit access.
