= WGHN-FM =

- Grand Haven, Michigan; United States
- Frequency: 92.1 MHz
- Branding: 92.1 FM WGHN

Programming
- Format: Adult contemporary
- Affiliations: NBC News Radio

Ownership
- Owner: Will Tieman; (WGHN, Inc.)

History
- First air date: January 28, 1969
- Former call signs: WGHN-FM (1969–1976); WFMG (1976–1983)
- Call sign meaning: Grand Haven

Technical information
- Licensing authority: FCC
- Facility ID: 72105
- Class: A
- ERP: 6,000 watts
- HAAT: 51 meters (167 ft)
- Transmitter coordinates: 43°3′25″N 86°14′28″W

Links
- Public license information: Public file; LMS
- Webcast: Listen Live
- Website: wghn.com

WGHN-FM (92.1 MHz) is a commercial radio station licensed to Grand Haven, Michigan, United States. It is owned by Will Tieman and it airs an adult contemporary format. The studios are on South Harbor Drive in Grand Haven. The transmitter is off 144th Avenue in Spring Lake, Michigan.

== History ==
=== Early years ===
WGHN-FM signed on the air on January 28, 1969. At first, WGHN-FM simulcast the programming of co-owned WGHN 1370 AM. In 1976, the FM station changed its call sign to WFMG. (Those call letters are now used on 101.3 FM in Richmond, Indiana.) WFMG separated its programming from its AM sister station. It began airing an automated easy listening format while the AM station continued with a full service format of middle of the road (MOR) music, sports, news and talk.

After the stations were sold in 1983, the FM's call sign was changed back to WGHN-FM and the two stations resumed simulcasting, which continued until January 4, 2008.

=== Change in ownership ===
WGHN owners Bill Struyk, President and General Manager, and Ron Mass, Vice President (known on the air as "Ron Stevens"), announced in April 2007 that they were selling WGHN and WGHN-FM. The new owner would be Lansing-based businessman Will Tieman. Tieman is also owner of Michigan State University's Spartan Sports Network. Struyk told the Grand Haven Tribune that he and Mass were both ready for retirement (1). Despite speculation that Tieman would try to move WGHN out of Grand Haven to become a Muskegon- or Grand Rapids-market station, Tieman told The Muskegon Chronicle that he did not plan to make any major programming changes (see: "New owner plans to keep WGHN local," The Muskegon Chronicle, May 8, 2007) 1, nor would he immediately discontinue WGHN's University of Michigan sports broadcasts in favor of Michigan State sports.

In early January 2008, Will Tieman ended the simulcast between WGHN AM and FM. The AM station became a sports radio outlet as a network affiliate of ESPN Radio. 92.1 FM continued with its adult contemporary format.

=== Tower eviction ===
On November 21, 2022, WGHN-FM and sister station WMPA went off the air after being evicted from their tower site by the city of Grand Haven. WGHN-FM's adult contemporary format temporarily moved to sister station WGHN 1370 AM, replacing that station's oldies format.

On January 31, 2023, WGHN-FM resumed broadcasting after being silent for two months. Its tower was relocated to a new site in Spring Lake.

In 2025, Tieman sold the AM station to Cano's Broadcasting, who took over its operations pending final FCC approval under new call letters, WGHA. Throughout 2025, however, the FM station celebrated the 69th anniversary of WGHN.

== Current programming ==
WGHN-FM primarily serves the Tri-Cities area of northwest Ottawa County, including Grand Haven, Spring Lake and Ferrysburg. It also provides a fairly strong Grade B signal to most of Muskegon.

The station plays adult contemporary music. Mary Ellen Murphy hosts Good Morning Grand Haven each weekday. Jesse Bruce hosts Lunchtime At The Laguna during the noon hour and Jesse Bruce Live weekday afternoons. WGHN-FM carries updates from CBS News Radio, as well as local news, sports and weather.

It airs Michigan State University football and basketball as well as Detroit Lions football. In 2026, it added Detroit Tigers baseball after WOOD AM-FM lost the rights to less-powerful WFGR. In the fall, Spring Lake High School football airs on Friday nights.

== Sources ==
- Michiguide.com - WGHN-FM History
- Michiguide.com - WGHN History
