= Grand Haven, Michigan =

- City
- City of Grand Haven
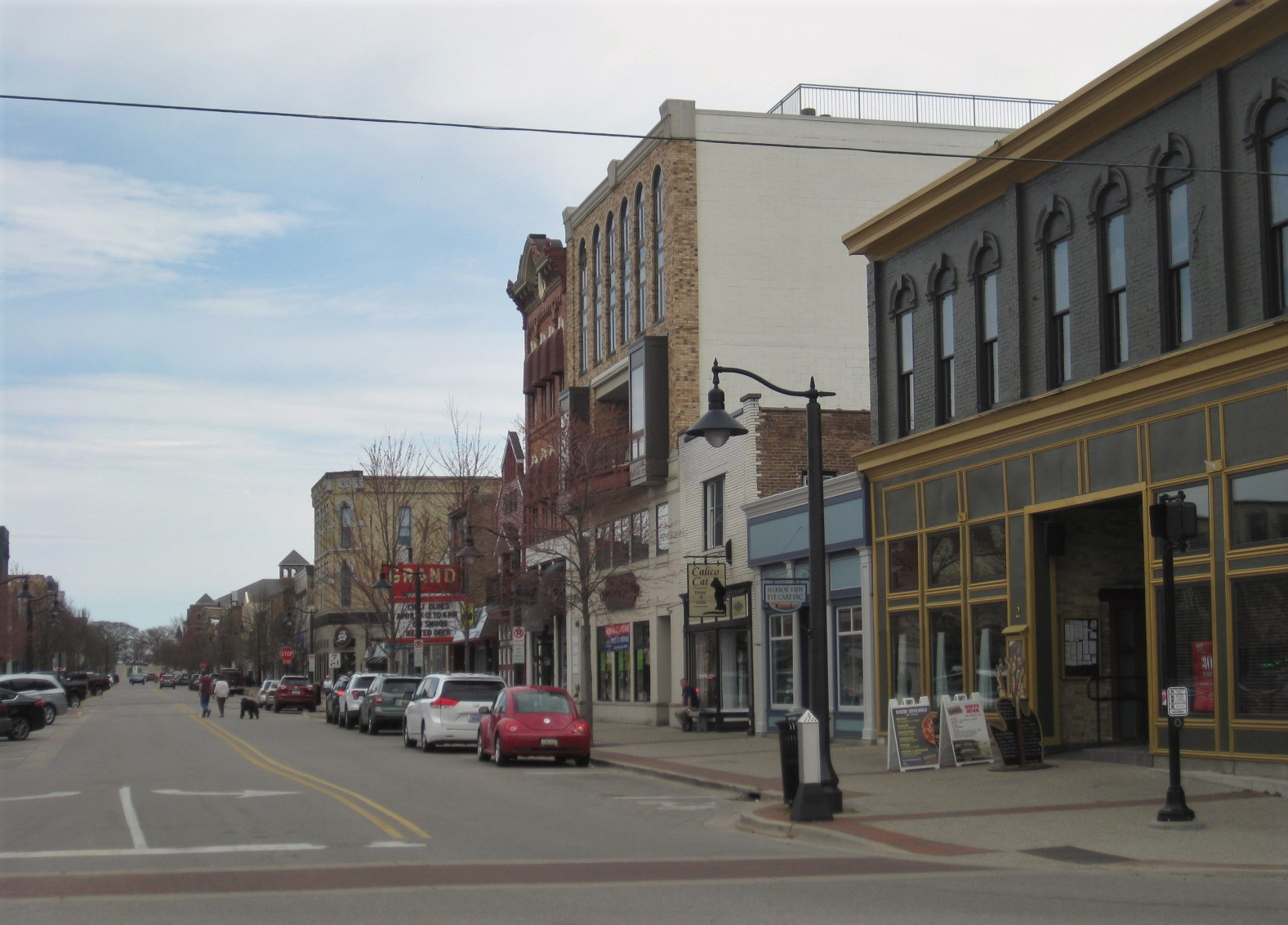
- Downtown along Washington Avenue

- Seal
- Nickname: Coast Guard City USA
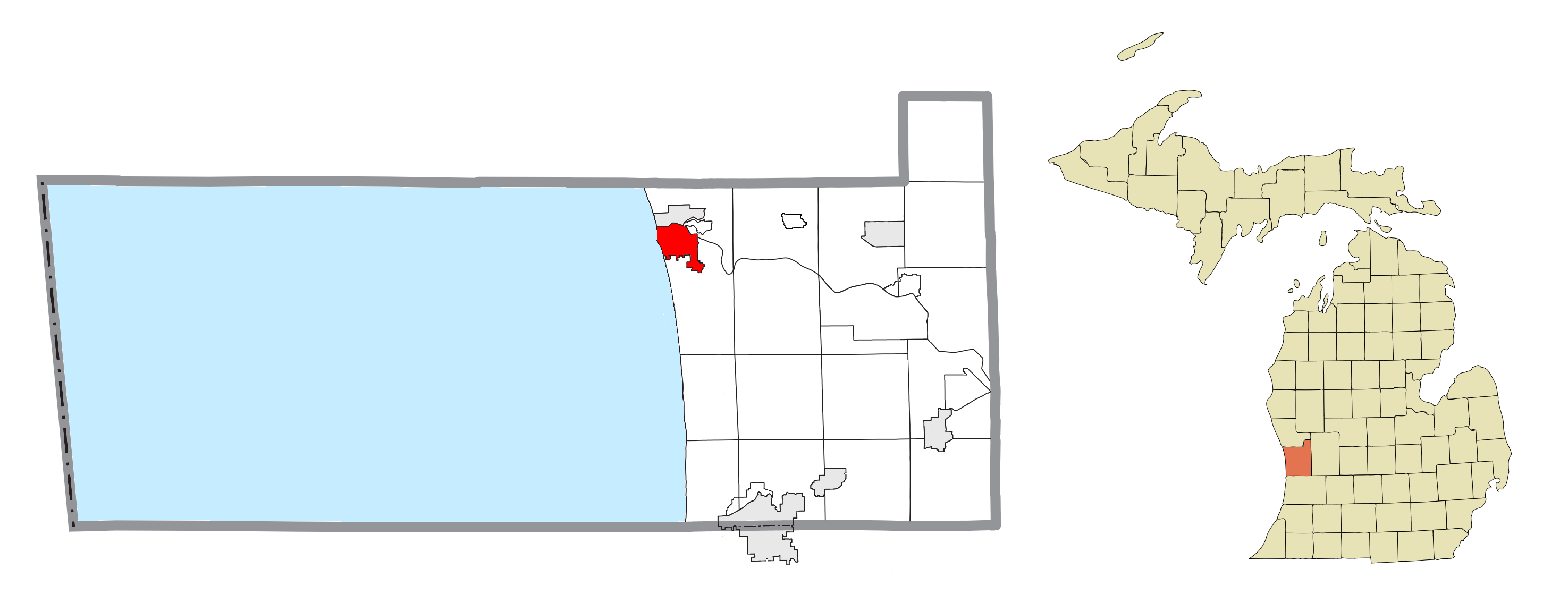
- Location within Ottawa County

- Location within the state of Michigan Location within the United States
- Coordinates: 43°03′47″N 86°13′42″W
- Country: United States
- State: Michigan
- County: Ottawa
- Settled: 1834
- Incorporated: 1867

Government
  - Type: Council–manager
  - Mayor: Bob Monetza
  - Clerk: Maria Boersma
  - Manager: Ashley Latsch

Area
  - Total: 6.25 sq mi (16.19 km^{2})
  - Land: 5.73 sq mi (14.83 km^{2})
  - Water: 0.53 sq mi (1.37 km^{2})
- Elevation: 662 ft (202 m)

Population (2020)
  - Total: 11,011
  - Density: 4,562.9/sq mi (1,761.76/km^{2})
- Time zone: UTC-5 (EST)
  - Summer (DST): UTC-4 (EDT)
- ZIP code(s): 49417
- Area code: 616
- FIPS code: 26-33340
- GNIS ID: 0627084
- Website: Official website

Grand Haven is a city within the U.S. state of Michigan and the county seat of Ottawa County. Grand Haven is located on the eastern shore of Lake Michigan at the mouth of the Grand River, for which it is named. As of the 2020 census, Grand Haven had a population of 11,011. It is located in the northern portion of Grand Haven Charter Township, but is administratively autonomous. The city is home to the Grand Haven Memorial Airpark (3GM). Grand Haven's ZIP code also serves most of Grand Haven and Robinson townships.

== History ==
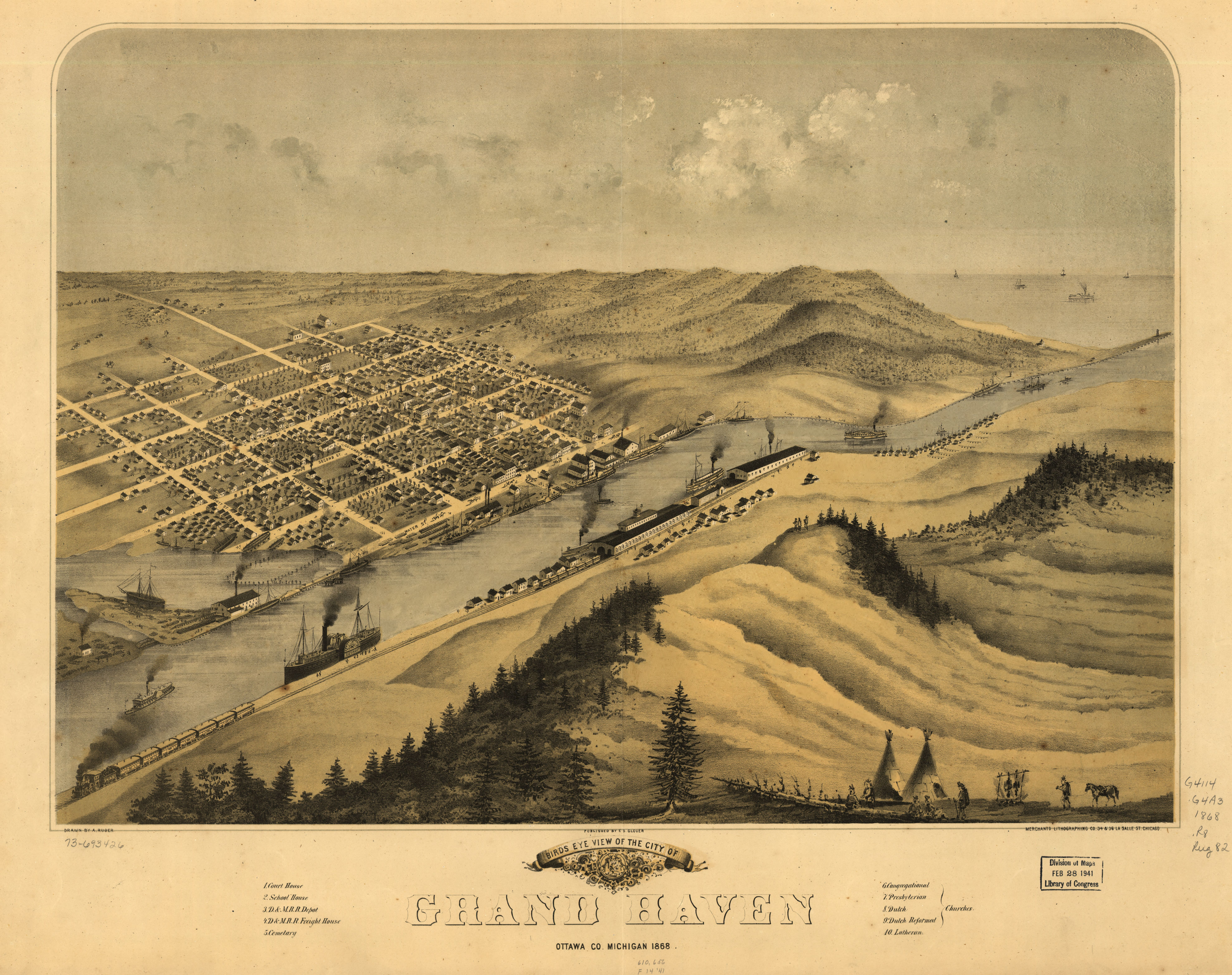
Panoramic map of Grand View in 1868 with a list of landmarks

The Potawatomi and Ottawa Native Americans lived in the area for centuries and used the river as a trade route into the interior of Michigan. Some of the long cultures of the Ottawa tribe are being revealed through the excavation of archeological artifacts.

The city dates its European-American founding to French colonial settlers. A fur trading outpost called Gabagouache was first established by Madeline La Framboise and her husband Joseph.

After the War of 1812, this area became more settled by Americans. A trading post was established here about 1821 by the American Fur Company, but the first permanent resident was a Presbyterian minister, William Montague Ferry, who founded in 1834 the first area church. Settler Rix Robinson named the town "Grand Haven" in 1835. Sheldon Tannery was founded in 1838, developing a process to make leather from the fur trade and cattle. The second church was organized in 1850. Ferry founded the city's first bank in 1851 in the Ferry & Son building on Harbor Drive. He also started a school, Ferry Elementary, which continues to operate. The city was incorporated in 1867.

In the mid-to-late 19th century, Grand Haven developed as a logging, lumber mill, and shipping town, as well as a shipbuilding center.

The city was served by the Grand Trunk Railway, which ran along the waterfront near the river. Its depot and offices have been adapted for use as a historical museum. The Story and Clark Piano Company built pianos in the city from 1900 to 1984. The smokestack at the piano factory collapsed during the Southern Great Lakes Derecho of 1998. In August 2006, Eagle-Ottawa Leather Co., which developed from the 1838 Sheldon Tannery, announced it would close its local operations that year.

Given the importance of shipping and water trade to the city, the Grand Haven Lighthouses were built in 1839 on the south pier to mark the most navigable channel into the river. The current lighthouses, painted red, were built in 1875 (outer light) and 1905 (inner). They are connected by a lighted catwalk, which runs along the pier to the shore.

George "Baby Face" Nelson and Homer Van Meter, who became notorious 1930s criminals, committed their first bank robbery at a Grand Haven bank. Nelson teamed up with Eddie Bentz to rob the People's Saving Bank on the corner of 3rd St. and Washington Ave. Bullet holes can still be found in some of the neighboring brick buildings.

== Geography ==
According to the United States Census Bureau, the city has a total area of 7.36 square miles (19.06 km^{2}), of which 5.77 square miles (14.94 km^{2}) is land and 1.59 square miles (4.12 km^{2}) is water.

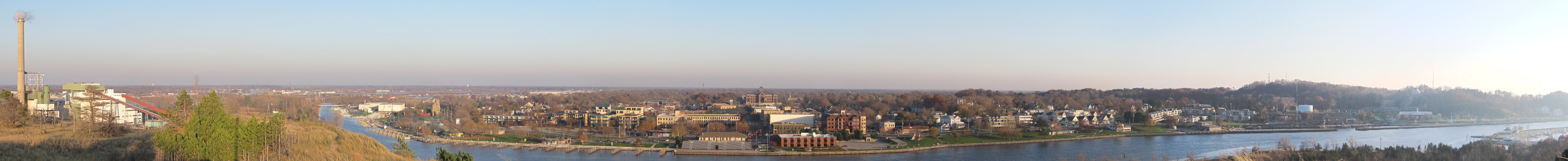
The Grand River waterfront as seen from Dewey Hill

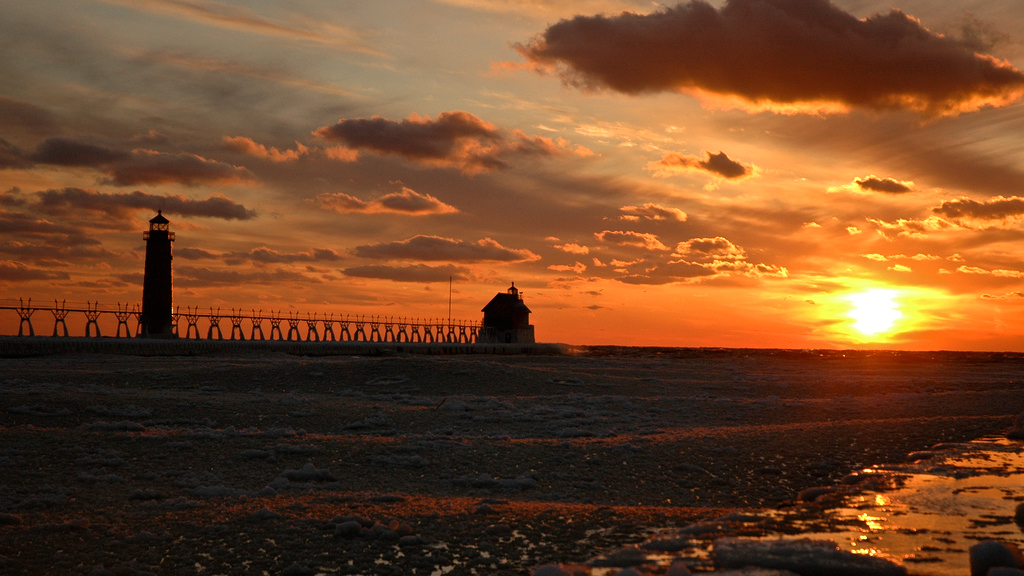
The Grand Haven fog signal and inner lighthouse in February 2006.

=== Climate ===
According to the Köppen Climate Classification system, Grand Haven has a warm-summer humid continental climate, abbreviated "Dfb" on climate maps. The hottest temperature recorded in Grand Haven was 98 °F (36.7 °C) on June 4, 2023, while the coldest temperature recorded was −13 °F (−25.0 °C) on February 20, 2015. Winter temperatures are considerably warmer than cities on the western shore of Lake Michigan.

Climate data for Grand Haven, Michigan, 1991–2020 normals, extremes 2008–present
Month	Jan	Feb	Mar	Apr	May	Jun	Jul	Aug	Sep	Oct	Nov	Dec	Year
Record high °F (°C)	63 (17)	63 (17)	82 (28)	80 (27)	95 (35)	98 (37)	96 (36)	93 (34)	92 (33)	83 (28)	73 (23)	65 (18)	98 (37)
Mean daily maximum °F (°C)	31.7 (−0.2)	33.2 (0.7)	42.4 (5.8)	54.7 (12.6)	67.1 (19.5)	76.4 (24.7)	80.0 (26.7)	78.9 (26.1)	72.9 (22.7)	60.0 (15.6)	46.7 (8.2)	36.5 (2.5)	56.7 (13.7)
Daily mean °F (°C)	25.5 (−3.6)	26.4 (−3.1)	34.0 (1.1)	45.3 (7.4)	57.0 (13.9)	66.7 (19.3)	71.0 (21.7)	69.4 (20.8)	62.7 (17.1)	51.3 (10.7)	39.8 (4.3)	30.9 (−0.6)	48.3 (9.1)
Mean daily minimum °F (°C)	19.3 (−7.1)	19.5 (−6.9)	25.5 (−3.6)	35.8 (2.1)	46.9 (8.3)	56.9 (13.8)	61.9 (16.6)	59.8 (15.4)	52.5 (11.4)	42.5 (5.8)	32.8 (0.4)	25.2 (−3.8)	39.9 (4.4)
Record low °F (°C)	−9 (−23)	−13 (−25)	−9 (−23)	15 (−9)	27 (−3)	40 (4)	44 (7)	41 (5)	38 (3)	26 (−3)	16 (−9)	6 (−14)	−13 (−25)
Average precipitation inches (mm)	2.84 (72)	2.00 (51)	2.27 (58)	3.71 (94)	3.81 (97)	3.54 (90)	3.62 (92)	3.13 (80)	3.45 (88)	3.75 (95)	3.08 (78)	2.44 (62)	37.64 (957)
Source 1: NOAA
Source 2: National Weather Service

== Demographics ==
Historical population
Census	Pop.	Note	%±
1870	3,147		—
1880	4,862		54.5%
1890	5,028		3.4%
1900	4,743		−5.7%
1910	5,856		23.5%
1920	7,205		23.0%
1930	8,345		15.8%
1940	8,799		5.4%
1950	9,536		8.4%
1960	11,066		16.0%
1970	11,844		7.0%
1980	11,763		−0.7%
1990	11,951		1.6%
2000	11,168		−6.6%
2010	10,412		−6.8%
2020	11,011		5.8%
U.S. Decennial Census

Grand Haven is part of the Grand Rapids Metropolitan Area, which had a population of 1,027,703 in 2014.

=== 2020 census ===
As of the 2020 census, Grand Haven had a population of 11,011. The median age was 47.7 years. 17.7% of residents were under the age of 18 and 25.8% of residents were 65 years of age or older. For every 100 females, there were 86.6 males, and for every 100 females age 18 and over, there were 84.4 males age 18 and over.

100.0% of residents lived in urban areas, while 0.0% lived in rural areas.

There were 5,175 households in Grand Haven, of which 19.8% had children under the age of 18 living in them. Of all households, 39.9% were married-couple households, 19.3% were households with a male householder and no spouse or partner present, and 34.3% were households with a female householder and no spouse or partner present. About 39.5% of all households were made up of individuals, and 19.3% had someone living alone who was 65 years of age or older.

There were 6,066 housing units, of which 14.7% were vacant. The homeowner vacancy rate was 1.0% and the rental vacancy rate was 8.9%.

Racial composition as of the 2020 census
Race	Number	Percent
White	10,008	90.9%
Black or African American	123	1.1%
American Indian and Alaska Native	61	0.6%
Asian	161	1.5%
Native Hawaiian and Other Pacific Islander	2	0.0%
Some other race	98	0.9%
Two or more races	558	5.1%
Hispanic or Latino (of any race)	355	3.2%

=== 2010 census ===
As of the census of 2010, there were 10,412 people, 4,769 households, and 2,721 families living in the city. The population density was 1,804.5 inhabitants per square mile (696.7/km^{2}). There were 5,815 housing units at an average density of 1,007.8 per square mile (389.1/km^{2}). The racial makeup of the city was 95.0% White, 0.7% African American, 0.9% Native American, 1.0% Asian, 0.4% from other races, and 1.9% from two or more races. Hispanics or Latinos of any race were 2.4% of the population.

There were 4,769 households, of which 24.8% had children under the age of 18 living with them, 42.1% were married couples living together, 11.0% had a female householder with no husband present, 3.9% had a male householder with no wife present, and 42.9% were non-families. 37.2% of all households were made up of individuals, and 14.9% had someone living alone who was 65 years of age or older. The average household size was 2.15, and the average family size was 2.82.

The median age in the city was 42.9 years. 20.7% of residents were under the age of 18; 7.6% were between the ages of 18 and 24; 24.2% were from 25 to 44; 28.5% were from 45 to 64; and 19.1% were 65 years of age or older. The gender makeup of the city was 47.4% male and 52.6% female.

=== 2000 census ===
As of the census of 2000, there were 11,168 people, 4,979 households, and 2,892 families living in the city. The population density was 1,923.5 inhabitants per square mile (742.7/km^{2}). There were 5,532 housing units at an average density of 952.8 per square mile (367.9/km^{2}). The racial makeup of the city was 96.35% White, 0.45% African American, 0.56% Native American, 0.87% Asian, 0.02% Pacific Islander, 0.40% from other races, and 1.35% from two or more races. Hispanics or Latinos of any race were 1.58% of the population.

There were 4,979 households, out of which 23.8% had children under the age of 18 living with them, 45.5% were married couples living together, 9.7% had a female householder with no husband present, and 41.9% were non-families. 34.8% of all households were made up of individuals, and 14.2% had someone living alone who was 65 years of age or older. The average household size was 2.17, and the average family size was 2.81.

In the city, the population was spread out, with 20.1% under the age of 18, 9.2% from 18 to 24, 27.6% from 25 to 44, 23.4% from 45 to 64, and 19.6% who were 65 years of age or older. The median age was 40 years. For every 100 females, there were 89.5 males. For every 100 females age 18 and over, there were 86.0 males.

== Business and tourism ==
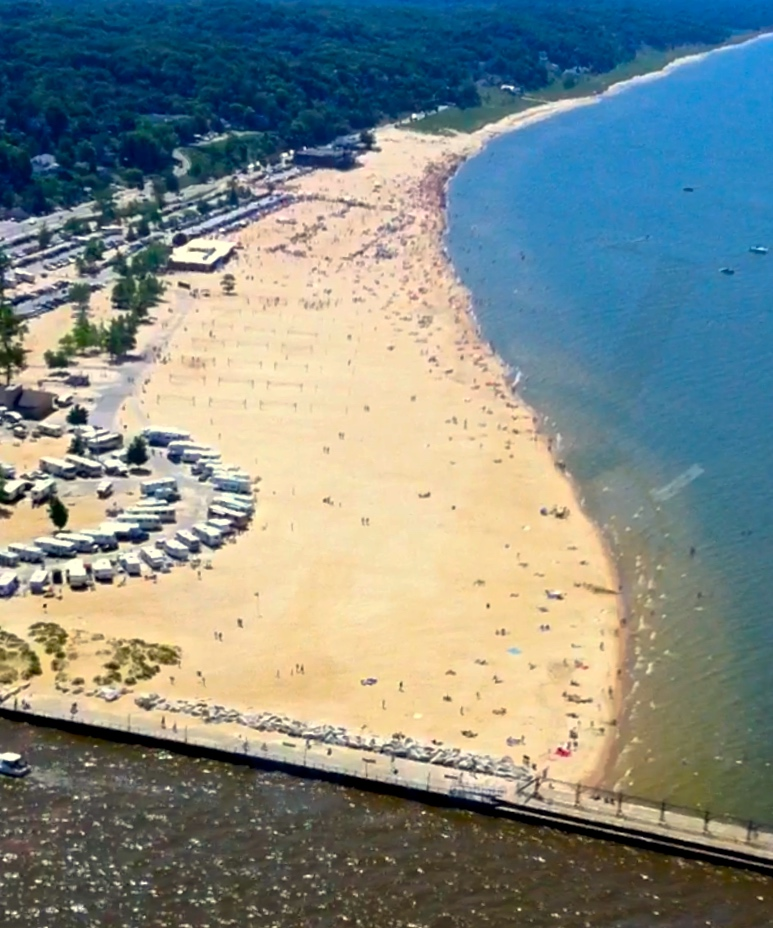
Aerial view of Grand Haven State Park.

The Grand Haven port community is an active beach resort with boating, fishing, sailing, biking, skating, etc., along with connecting campgrounds and recreational areas. The city has over 100 miles (160 km) of bike trails, a state beach, boardwalk, two lighthouses, a pier, wharf, a large charter fishing fleet, and a Great Lakes port, where it imports limestone, slag, cement, and coal while exporting sand. Grand Haven is a destination point for residents of inland cities of West Michigan, as well as many from the other side of the state. Grand Rapidians regularly visit to take advantage of the proximity to the Lake Michigan beaches, State campgrounds, restaurants, bars, and attractions, with many even owning cottages in the area as their home away from home.

Grand Haven State Park contains beaches which, in summer, water temperatures reach the low 70s°F (2013 had 19 days in the 70s), bringing tens of thousands of visitors as a boon to the local economy.

The state park also includes a campground on Lake Michigan, near the pier and lighthouses. In addition, the city features a ski park (Mulligan's Hollow Ski Bowl) and a skate park. The waterfront locations bring tourists from all over the state and region for activities which include boating, sailing, jet skiing, tubing, and windsurfing.

Grand Haven is home to the United States Coast Guard's "Sector Field Office Grand Haven." The first Coast Guard presence in the city was in 1924. The Coast Guard cutter Escanaba was based in the city until the Second World War. After it was sunk by a U-boat of Nazi Germany's Kriegsmarine, the citizens of Grand Haven raised more than $1,000,000 in bonds to build a replacement cutter bearing the same name; several pieces of wreckage remain displayed on the city's waterfront. Grand Haven hosts the annual Coast Guard Festival, a celebration based on Coast Guard Day, which draws U.S. and Canadian vessels along with parades of bands and other activities, including a memorial to the 101 sailors lost in the Escanaba sinking. The yearly attendance for this event exceeds 300,000 people over the two-week period of the festival. Grand Haven is the first city officially designated as Coast Guard City, USA, by an act of Congress signed by President Bill Clinton. The act was Public Law 105-383, enacted by the United States Congress and signed by the president on November 13, 1998.

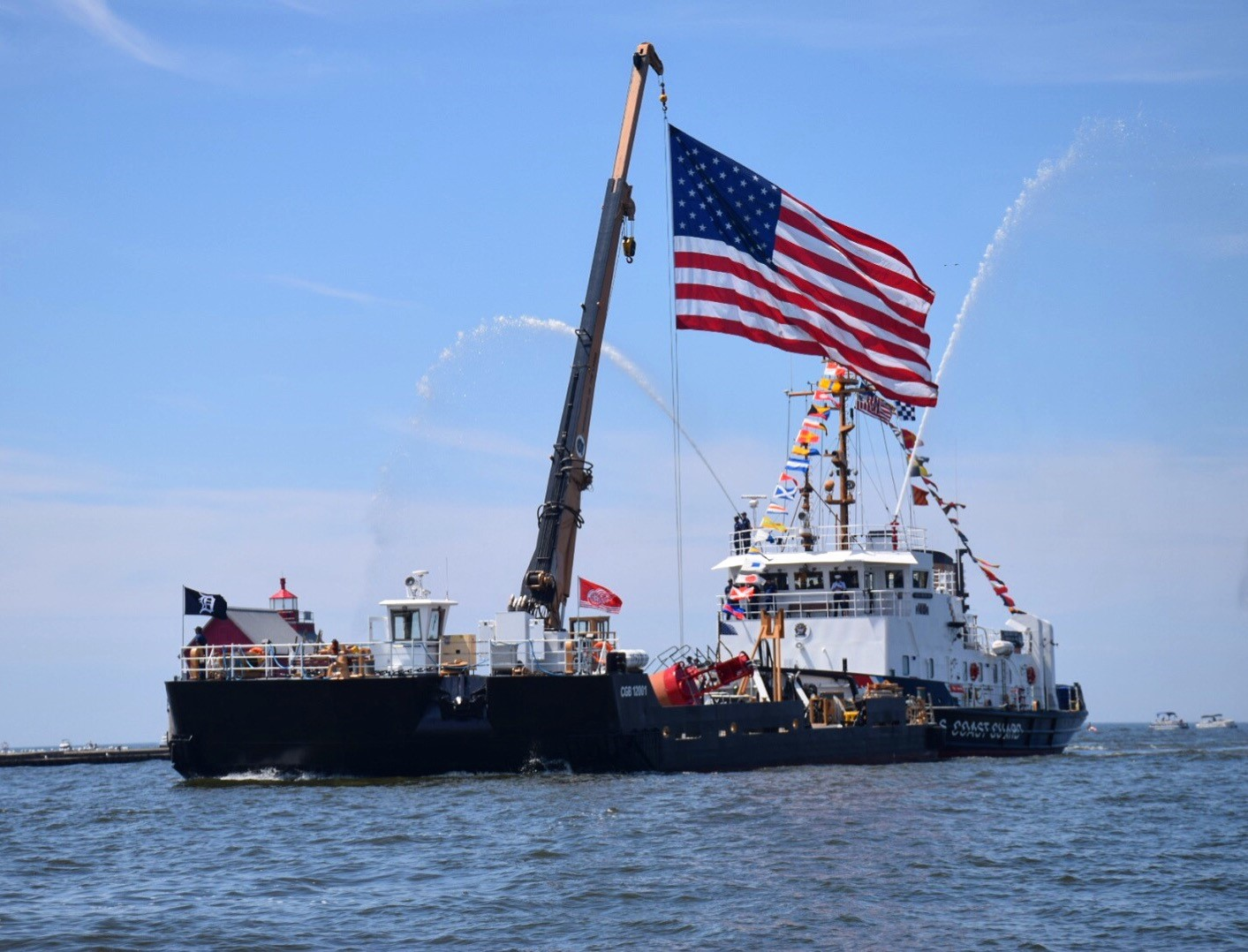
Coast Guard cutter entering the Grand Haven channel as part of the 2017 festival.

The Grand Haven Musical Fountain was built on the opposite bank of the Grand River from the city center in 1962. It plays nightly during the tourist season. When it was built, it was the world's largest such fountain. Today, the largest overall fountain is in Las Vegas.

Grand Haven is home to the Midwest Miniatures Museum, located in a historic mansion near downtown that displays hundreds of works of world-renowned miniaturists, with scale models from numerous time periods.

The City of Grand Haven has many parks. These include a large section of beach on Lake Michigan, a ski hill, and multiple boat launches. Duncan Woods (officially Duncan Memorial Park) is one of the largest sections of unspoiled virgin forest in the entire lower peninsula of Michigan. In these woods, visitors get to see what Michigan looked like before the deforestation of the lumber era.

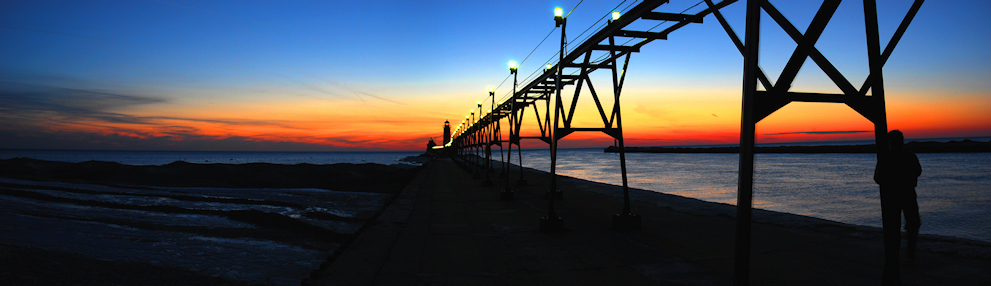
Grand Haven, Michigan: Grand River to the right and Lake Michigan up front.

== Technology ==
Grand Haven has been one of many technology leaders in West Michigan and throughout the country, having been featured in the national media, including on ABC, in PCWorld, ComputerWorld, and Forbes magazine. The city was the first municipality in the country to feature a citywide wireless internet service. The wireless service is designed to work throughout the city and up to 15 miles (24 km) offshore for boaters. In 2004, the city started offering wireless internet service for residents, businesses, and visitors for payment on varying cost-time scales.

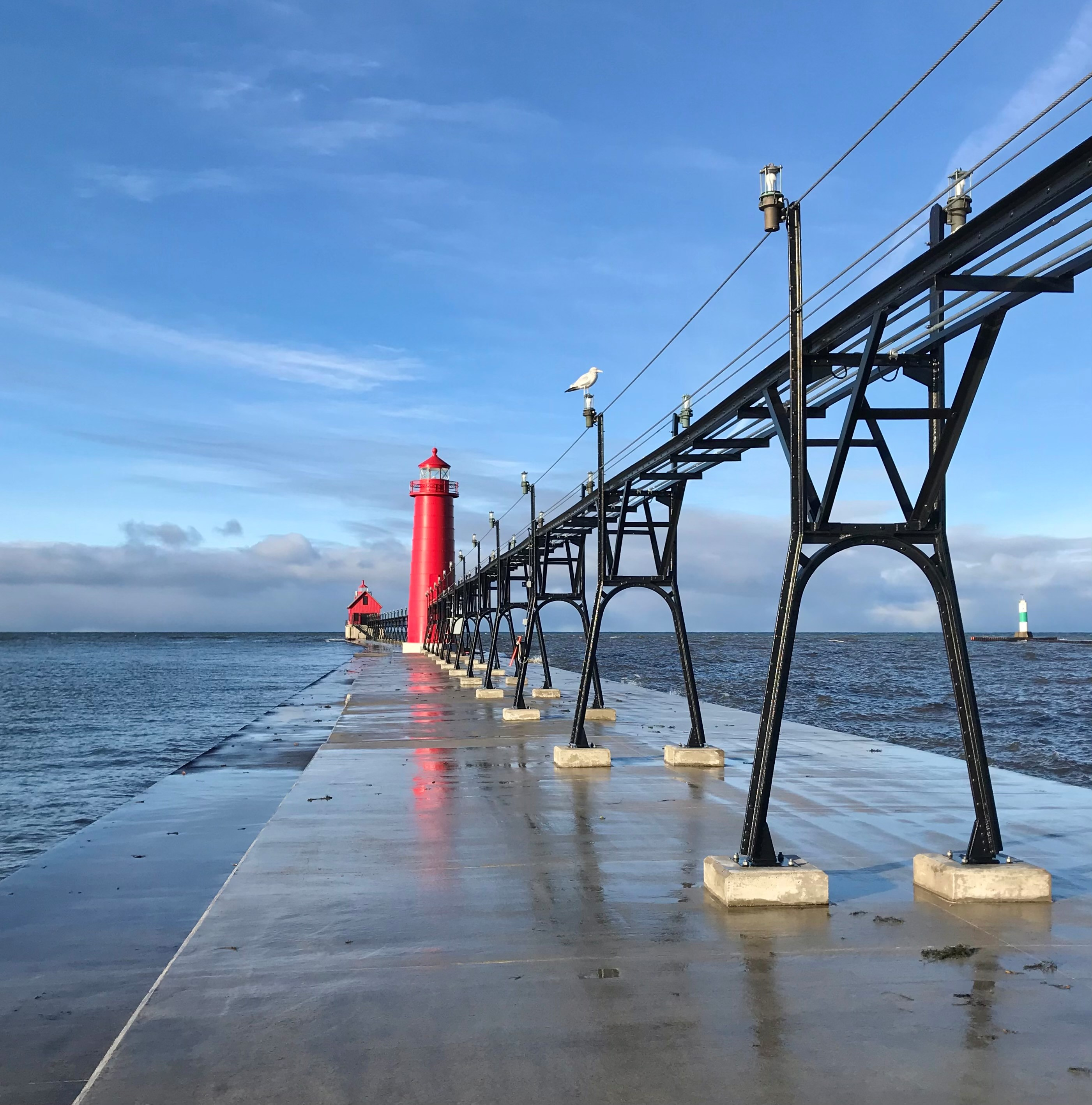
Grand Haven South Pier after resurfacing in 2019.

== Education ==
Grand Haven Area Public Schools:

- Grand Haven High School
- Central High School
- White Pines Intermediate School
- Lakeshore Middle School
- Voyagers School
- Rosy Mound Elementary
- Robinson Elementary
- Peach Plains Elementary
- Duneside Discovery Center at Mary A. White
- Lake Hills Elementary
- Griffin Elementary
- Ferry Elementary

Private schools:

- Grand Haven Christian School
- St. John's Lutheran School

== Transportation ==
=== Highways ===
- US 31 runs through the city as Beacon Boulevard and utilizes a drawbridge over the Grand River at the northern city limit.
- M-104 runs easterly from US 31 in Ferrysburg, through Spring Lake, and toward I-96.

== Media ==
The area is served by the daily newspaper Grand Haven Tribune, headquartered in Grand Haven and serving Spring Lake and Ferrysburg as well. The Tribune has a circulation of 8,813.

Radio stations serving the city include WGHA, WGHN-FM, WMPA, and WAWL. Listeners can also pick up stations from Muskegon and Grand Rapids.

== Notable people ==
- Howard Bailey, Major League Baseball pitcher
- Neal Ball, the first player in Major League Baseball to execute an unassisted triple play (accomplished in 1909)
- BØRNS, indie-pop singer-songwriter, EP "Candy"
- Dan Bylsma, former NHL player, Stanley Cup winner (coaching), former head coach of the Pittsburgh Penguins and Buffalo Sabres, and former assistant coach of the Detroit Red Wings
- John Engler, Michigan's 46th Governor (1991-2003), bought a Grand Haven home in 2024
- Thomas W. Ferry, U.S. Senator who served as President pro tempore of the United States Senate
- William Montague Ferry, a Presbyterian minister, missionary, and community leader who founded several settlements in Ottawa County.
- Gary Hogeboom, a former NFL quarterback, established a residence and a real estate development in Grand Haven after he retired from the NFL.
- Tom Izzo, Hall of Fame coach of the Michigan State Spartan's men's basketball team, owns a home here.
- Mike Teeter, former NFL special teams player
