= Piers and Revetments at Grand Haven, Michigan =

- U.S. National Register of Historic Places
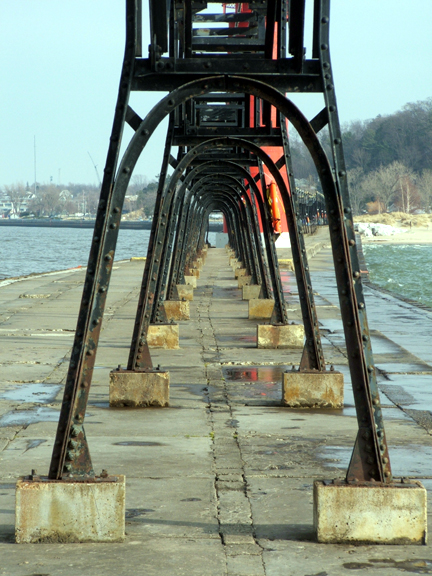

- Location within Michigan Location within the United States
- Interactive map
- Location: Mouth of Grand R., Grand Haven, Michigan
- Coordinates: 43°3′32″N 86°15′22″W
- Area: 8.2 acres (3.3 ha)
- Built: 1857
- Built by: Detroit and Milwaukee Railroad, United States Army Corps of Engineers
- Architect: Col. J.D. Graham
- NRHP reference No.: 95001161
- Added to NRHP: October 23, 1995

The Piers and Revetments at Grand Haven, Michigan are navigational structures located at the mouth of the Grand River in Grand Haven, Michigan. The structures were listed on the National Register of Historic Places in 1995.

== History ==
Grand Haven was first settled in 1827 as an outpost of the American Fur Company. When this operation was disbanded, former company agents Rix Robinson and John Stuart acquired the property and in 1834 platted the settlement of Grand Haven. By 1836, over 400 people lived there, and in 1838 the Federal government constructed a lighthouse at the mouth of the Grand River. In the 1840s, the lumber industry in the area gained momentum, with the increase in volume continuing through the 1850s. At the same time, Grand Haven's usage as a port facility was on the upswing. In 1855, the lighthouse, which had been damaged in a storm, was reconstructed on higher ground.

Also in 1855, two competing railroad lines serving Grand Haven, the Oakland and Ottawa Railroad and the Detroit and Pontiac Railroad, merged to form the Detroit and Milwaukee Railroad. The Detroit and Milwaukee Railroad aimed to develop a direct car ferry route across Lake Michigan from Grand Haven. Over the next three years, they developed the infrastructure to begin ferry service, including a 3,185-foot-long (971 m) pier at the south side of the entrance to the harbor. The first through train from Milwaukee to Detroit connected through the port in September 1858.

Meanwhile, the United States Army Corps of Engineers (COE) was developing a plan for harbor improvements in Grand Haven, which was completed by Col. J.D. Graham in 1857. However, the improvements were not authorized until 1866. Work soon began on the COE plan, starting with repairs to the Detroit and Milwaukee-built pier, whose design had caused washouts in several locations, and a portion of which had been heavily damaged by fire. Repairs were completed in 1867, and work began on the remainder of the COE plan. The improvements were slowly implemented through the rest of the 1860s and into the 1870s. In addition to the pier repairs, these improvements included construction of pile revetment, and strengthening the existing pierhead, dredging the channel, constructing a north pier, and constructing an additional revetment along the bend in the river. A light was added to the south pier in 1881.

By 1880, the COE had completed most of the construction work. During the 1880s, both of the piers were extended to give greater protection to the harbor and reduce the shoaling of sand into the channel. By 1890, the north pier was about 1,120 feet long, and the south pier approximately 1,300 feet. Despite the improvements to the harbor, serious problems with sand bars developing remained, and the piers were extended again, the north pier by 600 feet and the south pier by 550 feet.

Additional harbor improvements were made in the 20th century, starting with the extension of the revetments and the addition of concrete reinforcement. Dredging of the channel continued in the 1910s and 1920s. Between 1951 and 1983, sheet steel substructures were set into place along the piers and revetments.

== Description ==
The navigational structures at Grand Haven consist of two piers and two revetments located at the mouth of the Grand River. The northern pier is 1,414 ft (431 m) long, and the southern pier is 1,495 ft (456 m) long. The channel itself is 300 ft (91 m) wide and 23 ft (7.0 m) deep, running from Lake Michigan to a point 1,000 ft (300 m) inside the ends of the pier. The revetments are placed along the channel for a distance of 2,159 ft (658 m) along the north bank and 3,674 ft (1.120 km) along the south bank.

The construction on these structures spanned a 62-year period between 1857 and 1919. The substructures installed at the time consist of stone filled timber cribs, close driven round timber piles, and wood plank sheet piles. In addition, most of the substructure is covered with a steel sheet pile facade which was installed between 1951 and 1983. A slab concrete superstructure was built along the piers and revetments between 1916 and 1938.

== Gallery ==
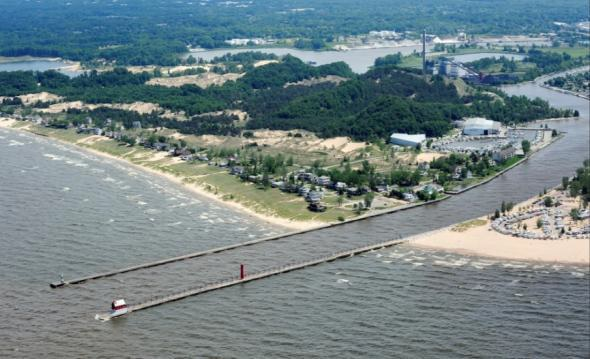
Aerial view

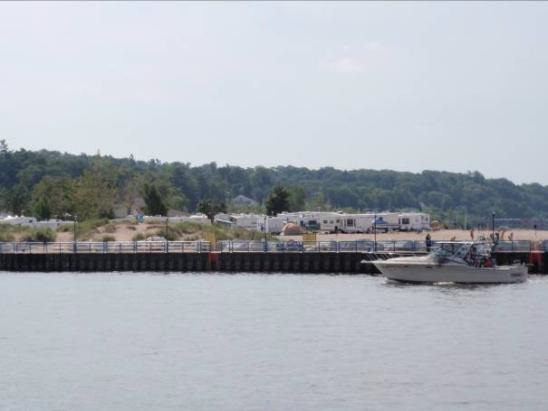
View of pier

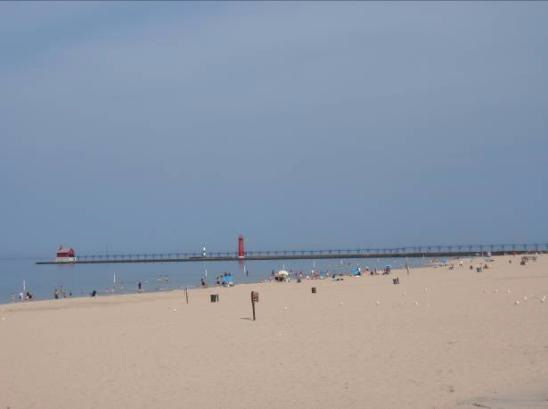
View of piers from Grand Haven State Park

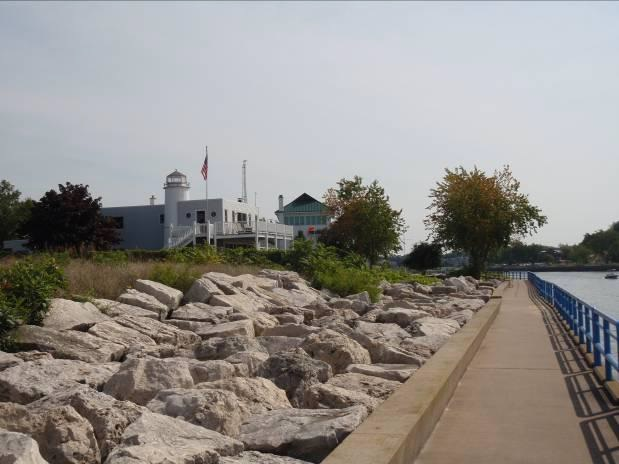
View along channel
