= Coast Guard Station Grand Haven =

United States Coast Guard station in Michigan

Sector Field Office Grand Haven
- Part of Coast Guard District 9
- Grand Haven, MI in United States of America
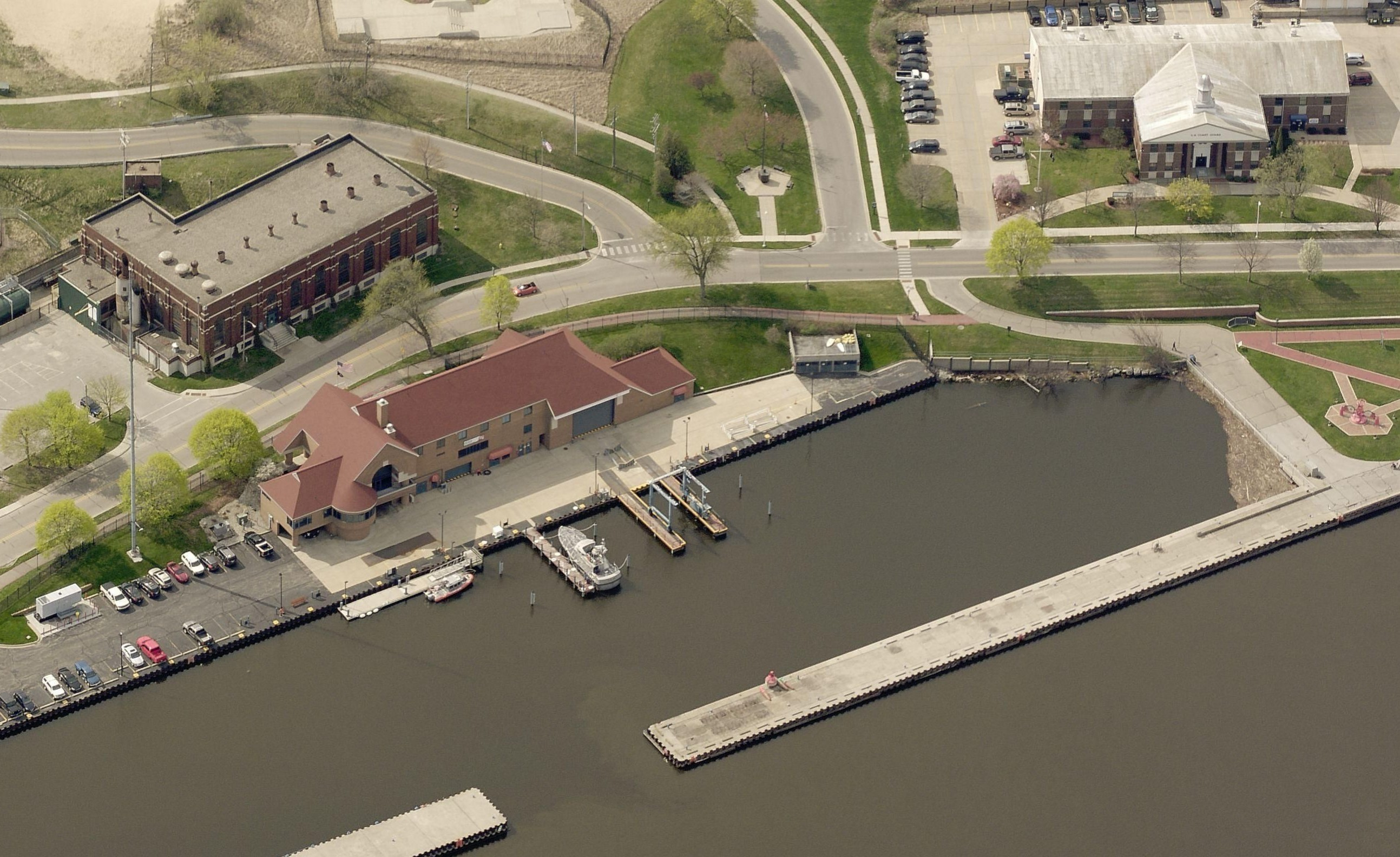

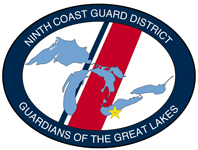

Site information
- Controlled by: United States Coast Guard

Location
- Coordinates: 43.0604°N 86.2385°W

Site history
- In use: 1876-Present

Garrison information
- Current commander: LT Paul Larouche

Coast Guard Station Grand Haven is a United States Coast Guard facility in Grand Haven, Michigan. A Sector Field Office for District 9 is positioned across the street.

== Description ==
Coast Guard Station Grand Haven is manned by active duty and reserve Coast Guardsmen. It is the home of two 47' Motor Life Boats, three 29' Response Boat - Smalls, and two 15' ice or shallow rescue skiffs. The station's primary missions are search and rescue and maritime law enforcement on over 3,500 square nautical miles and four counties on the eastern half of Lake Michigan. Station Grand Haven is also the parent command to Aids to Navigation Team/Seasonal Search & Rescue Detachment Muskegon, located near the mouth of Muskegon Harbor, and seasonal Station Holland, located on the shore of Lake Macatawa. The main station is located on the Grand River in Grand Haven, MI, which has been given the distinction of being named "Coast Guard City, USA". Unit personnel and resources are highly involved in the planning and execution of operations during the annual Coast Guard Festival, a week-long celebration that brings hundreds of thousands of visitors to this summer vacation destination.

As of 2023, Station Grand Haven has 35 active duty Coast Guardsmen.

== History ==
The history of the Coast Guard in Grand Haven dates back to at least 1876 when the Eleventh District of the U.S. Life Saving Service (USLSS) established its headquarters in town. On May 1, 1877, the USLSS opened the first station on the north side of the Grand River. The first station had assigned to it one six-ton self-bailing, self-righting lifeboat, one six-man surfboat, and a life car.

Following the reorganization of the USLSS and the Revenue Cutter Service into the Coast Guard in 1915, Grand Haven became headquarters for the Tenth Coast Guard District. Grand Haven's second station was built just west of the old station. It opened its doors on December 22, 1922, and at this time Grand Haven had its first power boat.

With the reorganization of 1939, Cleveland succeeded Grand haven as headquarters of the Ninth Coast Guard District, but Grand Haven remained an important location with a Coast Guard station, a lighthouse, and USCGC Escanaba, which exploded and sank on June 13, 1943, while on convoy duty in the North Atlantic. All but two men of the 103 man crew died that day.

The third, and present day station, is located on the south side of the Grand River along Government Road. This location is further upriver from the previous two stations. It opened its doors on June 5, 1989.

On April 28, 1991, William Dale Kozlowski, a seaman of Station Grand Haven, was fatally injured by the propeller of the station's 22 foot small boat after being tossed from the station canoe during a collision with the small boat, 50 feet from the dock. A second crewmember aboard the canoe received minor head injuries.

== Photo Gallery ==
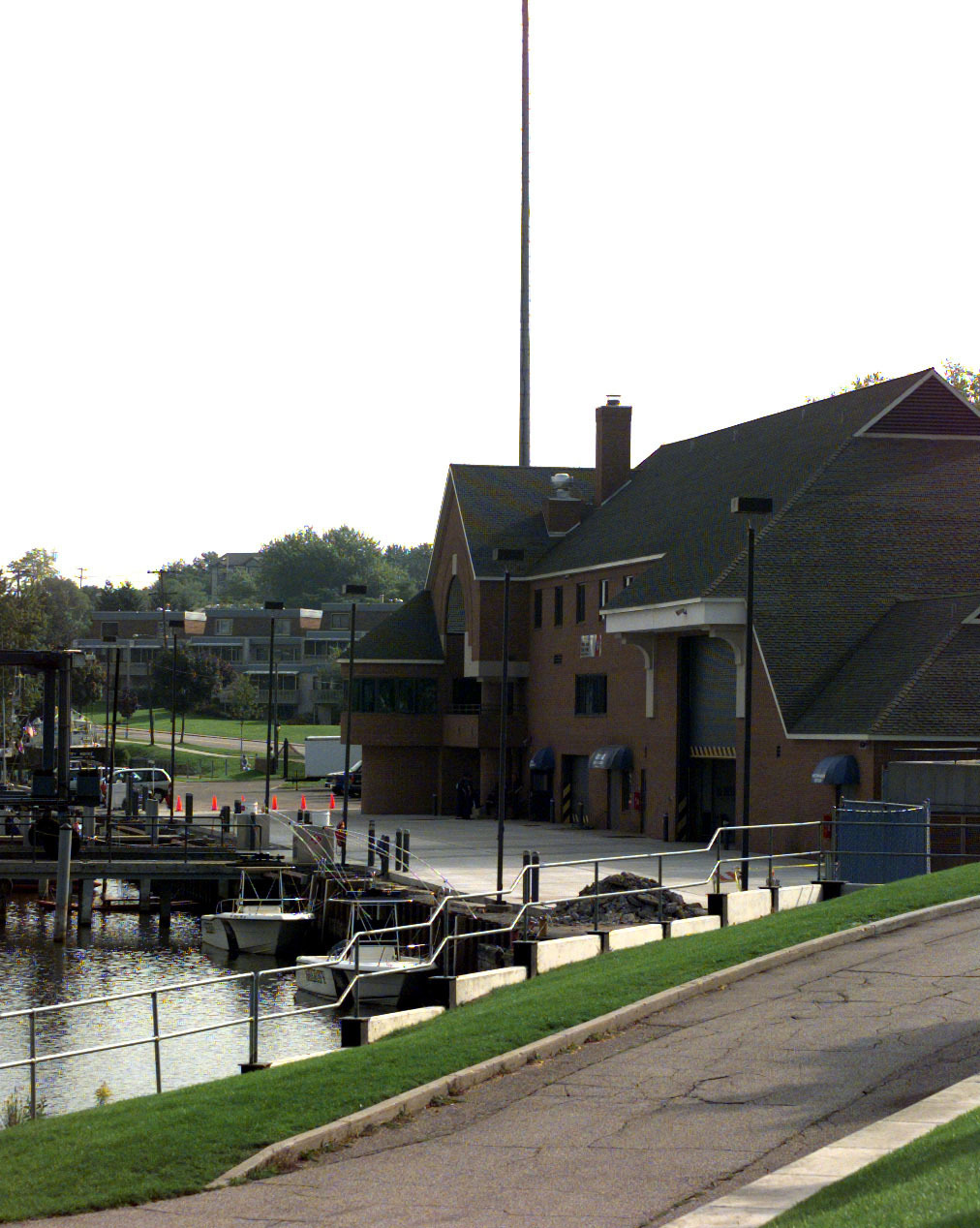
Station Grand Haven main building

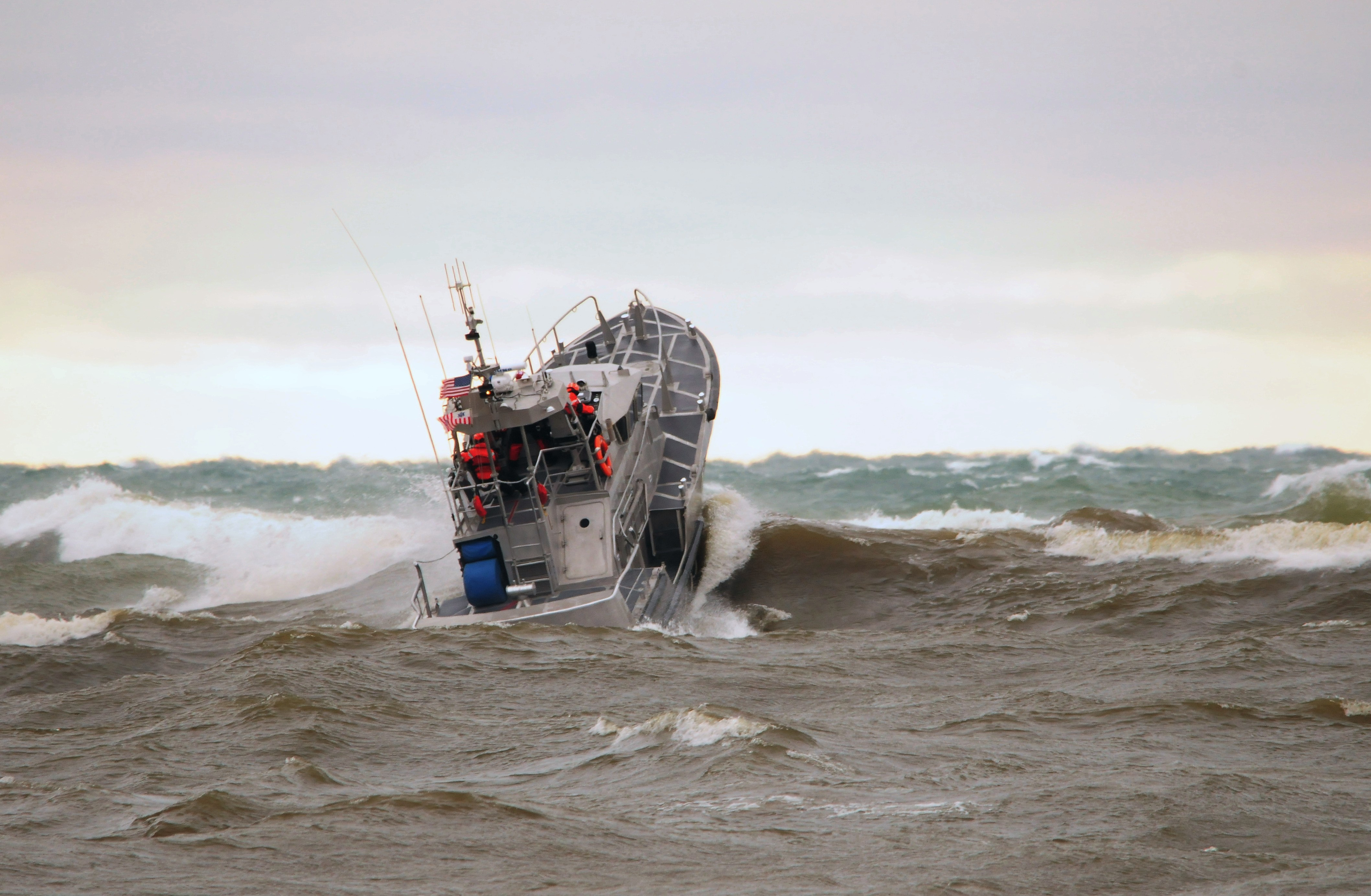
Coast Guard Station Grand Haven trains in heavy weather

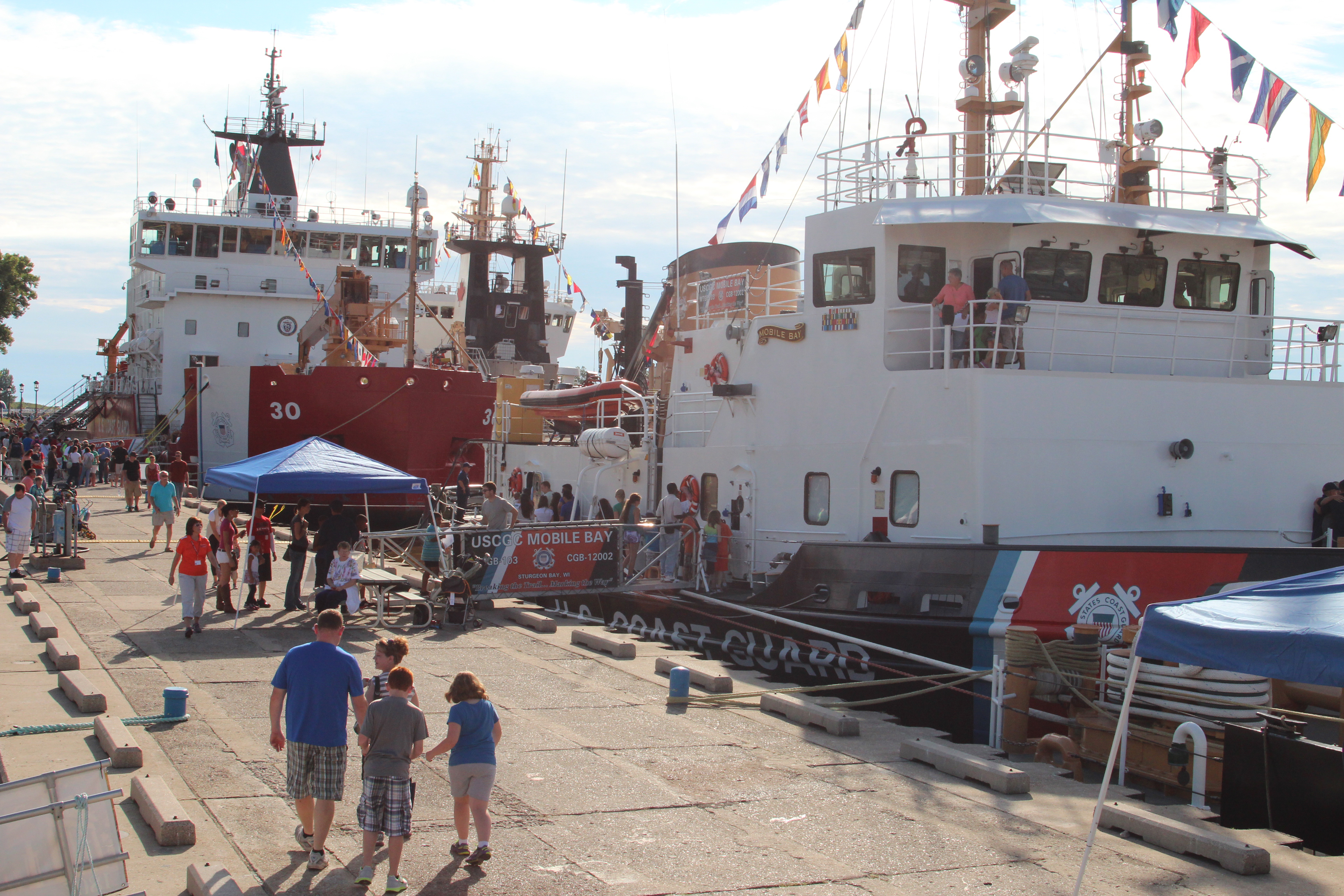
US Coast Guard Festival at Station Grand Haven

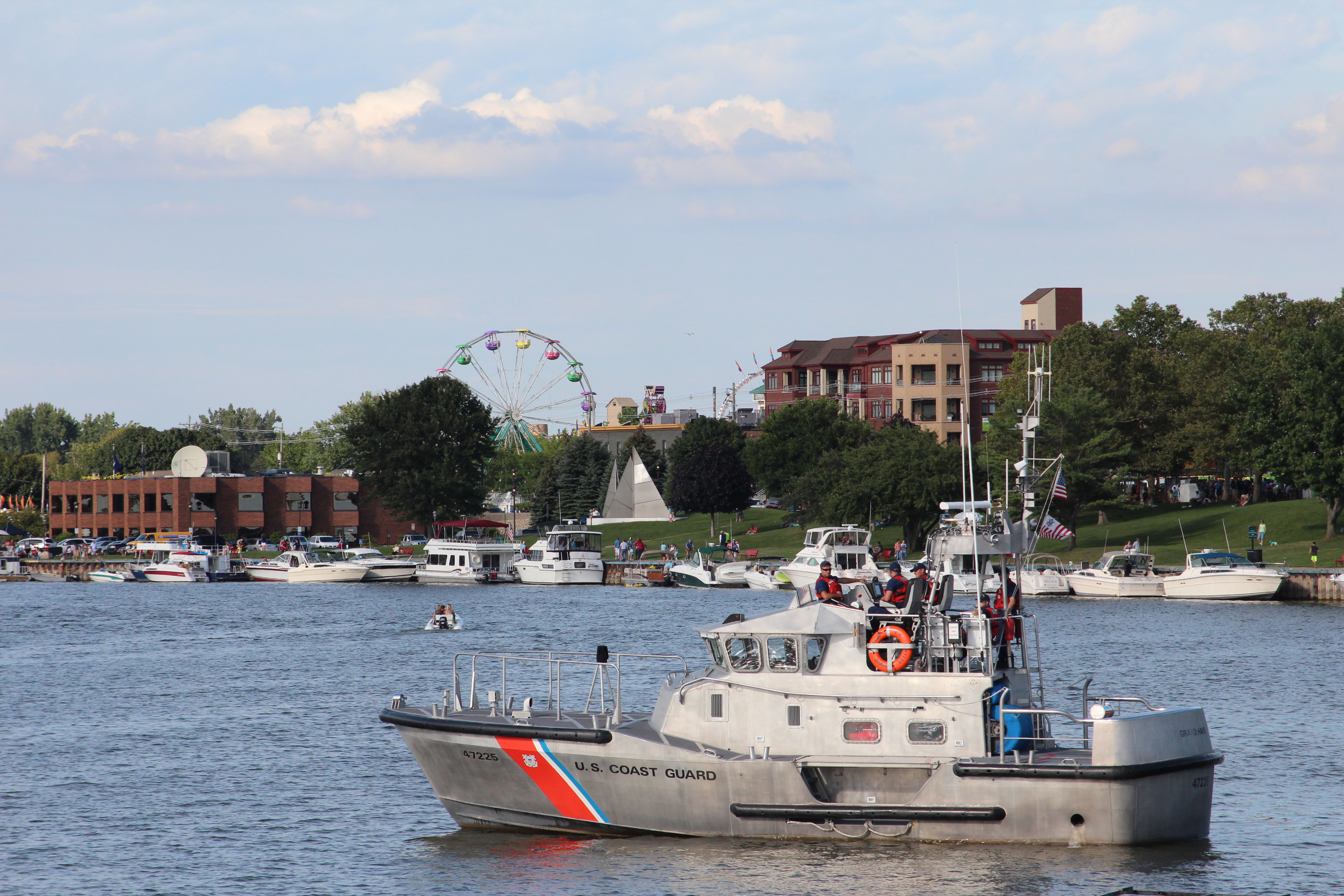
US Coast Guard Festival Grand Haven

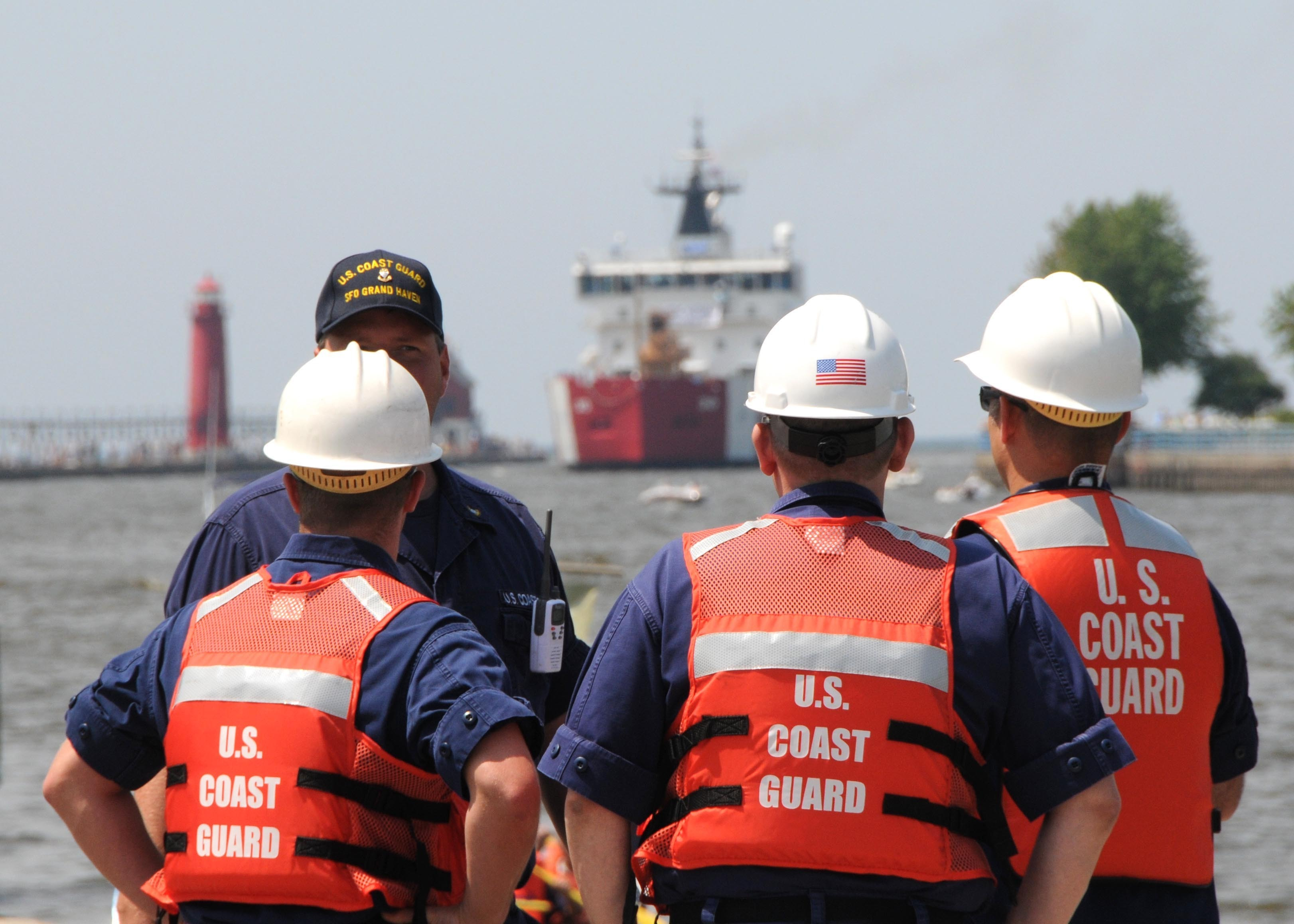
Coast Guardsmen await the arrival of the USCGC Mackinaw
