= Cascade Falls (Jackson, Michigan) =

Manmade waterfall attraction in Michigan, US

Coordinates: 42.22952°N 84.43375°W

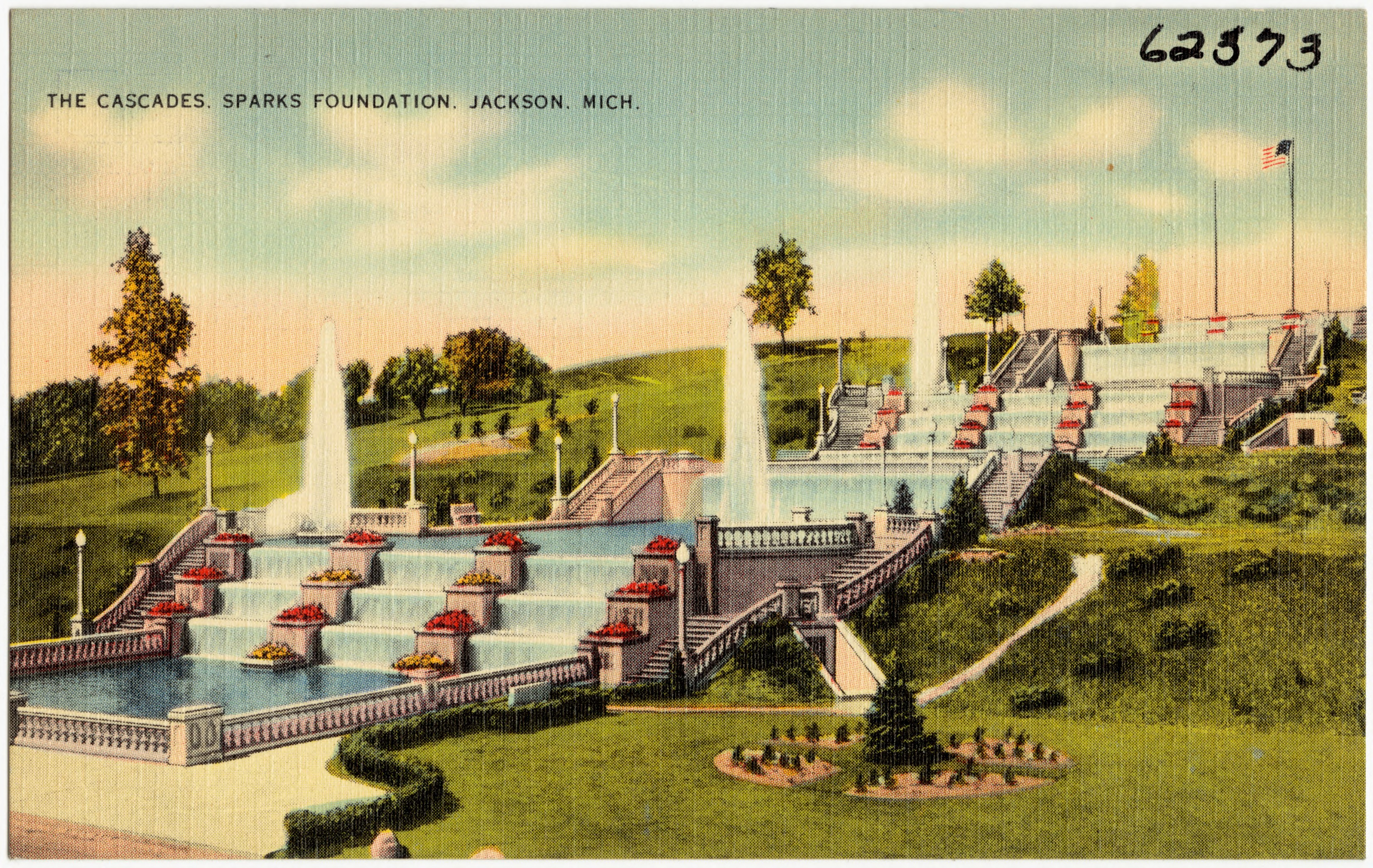
Early postcard image of the cascades

The Cascades is a manmade waterfall attraction in Sparks Foundation County Park, Jackson, Michigan. The falls are both illuminated and choreographed and is the site of concerts and special events from Memorial Day to Labor Day. Three times a year, Memorial Day, Independence Day, and Labor Day, fireworks displays are presented at the Cascade Falls. Since its creation in 1932, millions of people have enjoyed the beauty of the Cascades.

== Features ==
The falls have six fountains, three reflecting pools, each 30 feet (9.1 m) by 90 feet (27 m) and 16 falls, 11 of which are illuminated. These illuminated falls are accompanied by a variety of music. It is 500 feet (150 m) long, 64 feet (20 m) wide and 60 feet (18 m) deep. There are 126 steps along each side of the falls allowing visitors access to the top. This walkway passes the three reflecting pools. The falls are operated through the use of a 2,000 US gallons (7.6 m^{3}) per minute water pump that filters, chlorinates, and recycles the water. The Splash Pad, opened in 2017, features a miniature water park with a large water-dumping bucket on the south side of the Cascade Falls.

The Cascade Falls are operated by the Jackson County Parks Department. They are open Wednesday through Sunday from 8:00 p.m. to 11:00 p.m., Memorial Day through Labor Day.

== History ==
The Cascade Falls were built in 1932. They are the result of William Sparks' dream to do something for the people of Jackson and to build an attraction that would provide visitors with a positive impression of the city.

Directly west of the Sparks home was swampy bog land. Mr. Sparks' original plan was to acquire the property and convert it into a skating pond. His vision grew, and soon included plans called for the development of a park which would include a golf course, lagoons, canal, toboggan slides, landscaped grounds, picnic areas, a clubhouse, and the Cascades. The William and Matilda Sparks Foundation was created in the fall of 1929 to develop the land into a recreation spot and meditation center.

Magic Fountain of Montjuïc in Barcelona, Spain served as Sparks’ inspiration for the Cascade Falls. After experimenting with a scale model, a contract was awarded to the North-Moller Construction Company on October 17, 1931. The contract required that the job be completed by April 26, 1932, that Jackson labor be used, and that married men be shown preference. Work continued on schedule throughout the winter, and the falls opened to a crowd of 25,000 people on May 9, 1932, Captain Spark's 59th birthday.

== Renovations ==
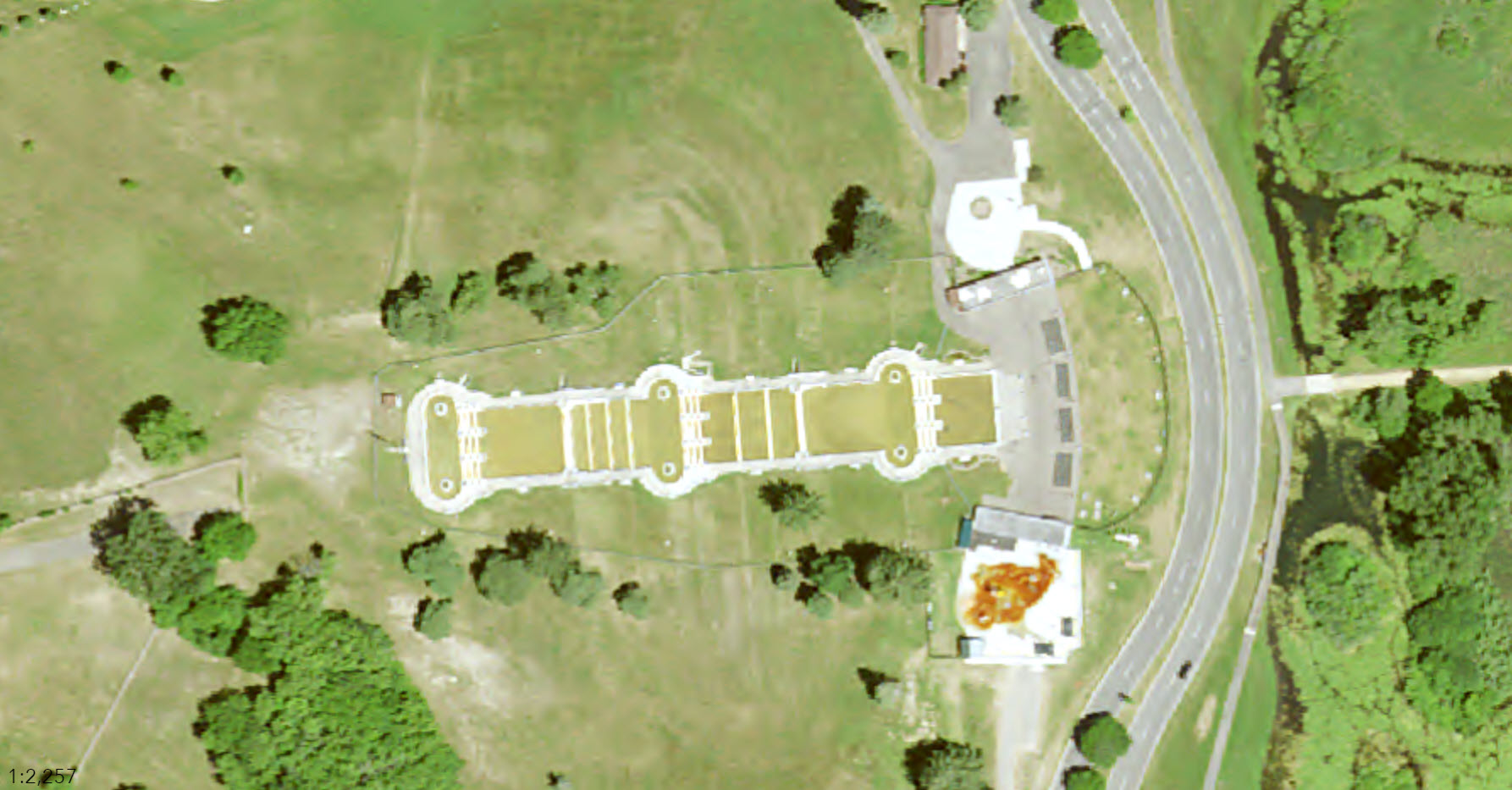
Satellite view of the structure, shown circa 2020. The fencing can be seen around the fountain area.

The original "Save the Cascades" movement was in 1969-1970 after the falls had fallen into disrepair and vandalism. The falls amphitheater was built and the grounds enclosed to protect the falls from vandalism. The "Cascades Rebirth" was in 1982–1983. New computerized lighting systems and new sound systems were installed. The next Cascades project was in 1992–1993. Extensive concrete repairs were done, new walkways added, and a new filtered and chlorinated well water system installed. In 2012, Spicer Group performed an inspection of the falls and developed a capital improvement plan. In May of 2013, the 1,230 incandescent bulbs in the falls were replaced with 90 LED rope lights. In addition, a new computer system for music and light choreography was put in place. It replaces the outdated system that required cassette tapes to change the lights and music. Demolition of the 150-foot concrete wall surrounding the falls began in December of 2014. Build in 1970, the concrete wall was replaced with an archway and fence that allow for greater visibility of the falls. In June of 2017, Cascades opened their brand new Splash Pad, which was responsible for 40% of the Cascades' visitors in 2017. In 2018, a parks millage was passed in Jackson County that raised $500,000 to support improvement projects for the falls. All of the original fountain pumps and motors were replaced in 2019, along with the Falls building roof. In 2020, the primary electrical system was replaced, and the secondary electrical panels were upgraded in 2023. The falls received a $1 million anonymous donation to support repairs of the falls in April of 2024. Fox47News brought attention to the crumbling state of the Cascade Falls in a September 2024 broadcast, which revealed cracking concrete and outdated pumps that spurred further media attention. In 2024, LED lights were replaced, along with controls, electrical wiring, and the falls' computer. As of 2025, Cascades are accepting donations to revitalize the falls with a new pump room and the replacement of crumbling concrete.

== See also ==
- Grand Haven Musical Fountain
- Media related to Cascade Falls (Jackson, Michigan) at Wikimedia Commons
