= Grand Haven South Pierhead Inner Light =

Lighthouse in Michigan, United States

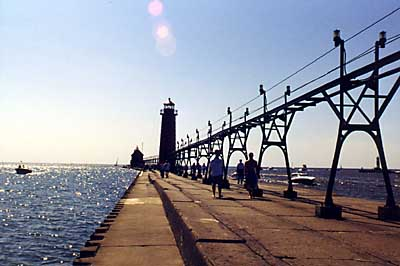
- South Pierhead Inner Light with entrance light in background
- Location: Grand Haven, Michigan
- Coordinates: 43°03′26.1″N 86°15′13.7″W

Tower
- Constructed: 1881
- Automated: 1969
- Height: 51 feet (16 m)
- Markings: Red

Light
- First lit: 1907
- Focal height: 16 m (52 ft)
- Lens: 9.8 inches (250 mm)
- Range: 3 nautical miles (5.6 km; 3.5 mi)
- Characteristic: Oc R 4s

Grand Haven South Pierhead Inner Light is the inner light of two lighthouses on the south pier of Grand Haven, Michigan where the Grand River enters Lake Michigan. A lighthouse was first lit there in 1839. The lighthouse was put up for sale in 2009 under the National Historic Lighthouse Preservation Act. The City of Grand Haven now owns the pier, but it is maintained by the Army Corps of Engineers.

== See also ==
- Grand Haven South Pierhead Entrance Light
