= WFMG =

Richmond, Indiana; United States
- Frequency: 101.3 MHz
- Branding: G101.3

Programming
- Format: Hot adult contemporary

Ownership
- Owner: Duncan Media Inc

History
- First air date: December 17, 1960 (as WKBV-FM at 106.5)
- Former call signs: WKBV-FM (1960–1976); WRIA (1976–1986)
- Former frequencies: 106.5 MHz (1960–1962)
- Call sign meaning: W F MaGic (previous branding)

Technical information
- Licensing authority: FCC
- Facility ID: 41845
- Class: B1
- ERP: 20,500 watts
- HAAT: 83 meters (272 feet)
- Transmitter coordinates: 39.828056°N 84.932500°W

Links
- Public license information: Public file; LMS
- Webcast: Listen Live
- Website: g1013.com

WFMG (101.3 MHz G101.3) is a commercial FM radio station licensed to Richmond, Indiana, and serving parts of Indiana and Ohio. It carries a hot adult contemporary radio format and is owned by Whitewater Broadcasting, along with former employee and local mayor Dave Snow, with the license held by the Rodgers Broadcasting Corporation.

WFMG has an effective radiated power of 20,500 watts The radio studios and transmitter are located on West Main Street in Richmond.

== History ==
=== Beautiful music, WKBV-FM ===
On December 17, 1960, the station signed on as WKBV-FM at 106.5 MHz. WKBV-FM featured a beautiful music format through the 1960s and 70s that was mostly automated. It played quarter hour sweeps of instrumental cover versions of pop hits, as well as Broadway and Hollywood show tunes.

WKBV-FM moved to 101.3 MHz in the early 1960s. In the 1970s, WKBV-FM added more vocals and cut back on some of the instrumentals.

=== Adult contemporary, WRIA ===
In 1976, the station went with all vocals as a soft adult contemporary station, switching its call sign to WRIA, standing for "Richmond Indiana." The station eventually moved to a more upbeat adult contemporary sound by the mid-1980s. "FM 101" switched back to soft adult contemporary in 1986. The call sign was changed to WFMG and the station became known on the air as "magic 101; lite rock, less talk."

This format continued until the late 1980s when competitor WQLK dropped its top 40 format in favor of classic hits. "Magic 101" maximized on this move by adding hotter records to its playlist by 1990. Also added was a nightly countdown show as well as the weekly syndicated "American Top 40 with Casey Kasem." Unlike WQLK, "Magic 101" did not go full-fledge into the format in order to maintain its presence as an adult contemporary station.

=== Oldies and hot adult contemporary ===
By 1991, WFMG began adding a couple of weekend oldies shows to its line-up, which eventually led up to a format change in December 1991. The station became known as "Goodtime Oldies 101" and eventually just "Oldies 101." Unlike many of the oldies stations of the early '90s, WFMG played a generous amount of '70s pop and more or less stayed away from '50s doo-wop and pop.

After two years, the station dropped the "oldies" name and gradually moved back into a contemporary music direction. The transition was complete by 1994 when the station officially became hot adult contemporary "Hits 101.3," featuring music of the '80s and '90s. The station remained "Hits" until the late '90s when the station became "G 101-3" with an image change.

== Personalities ==
WFMG personalities are known as the "G Crew." Rick Duncan is the long-time morning show host. Fridays from 7 to 10 are known as "The Free For All Friday," allowing listeners to request any song in any format, even Christmas songs in July as long as it follows the two following rules, a clean version can be found and it is up-tempo.

Scott Epic hosts middays with a lunchtime request show called "The Electric Lunch." Dave D hosts the afternoon show and Keith Kassidy is heard evenings. Andrew Hoover can be heard Saturday mornings. News updates are provided by Noah Shubert. Weather is provided by WDTN-TV in Dayton. G1013 also carries Miami University RedHawks football & basketball teams. Longtime G101-3 personality Dave Snow left the station in 2015 to run for mayor of the city of Richmond, Indiana.

== Signal ==
In 2005, WFMG's sister station, WIFE-FM in nearby Connersville, applied to move to Norwood, Ohio, in the Cincinnati radio market. As a result of this move, many stations throughout Indiana, Ohio, and Kentucky had to reduce power or change frequencies in order to make the move feasible. Therefore, WFMG had to cut its power in half, from 50,000 watts to 25,000 watts, in order for Radio One's WIZF in Cincinnati to move to 101.1 MHz.

WFMG, being on first-adjacent frequency from 101.1, had to reduce its power in order to prevent interference with WIZF. This affected WFMG's reception in the southern Whitewater Valley once WIZF signed on 101.1. Reception in the eastern, western, and northern portions of the coverage area were less affected.
