= Coast Guard Festival =

Festival in Grand Haven, Michigan, US

- Status: active
- Frequency: Annually
- Location: Grand Haven, Michigan
- Coordinates: 43°3′47″N 86°13′42″W
- Country: United States
- Website: www.coastguardfest.org

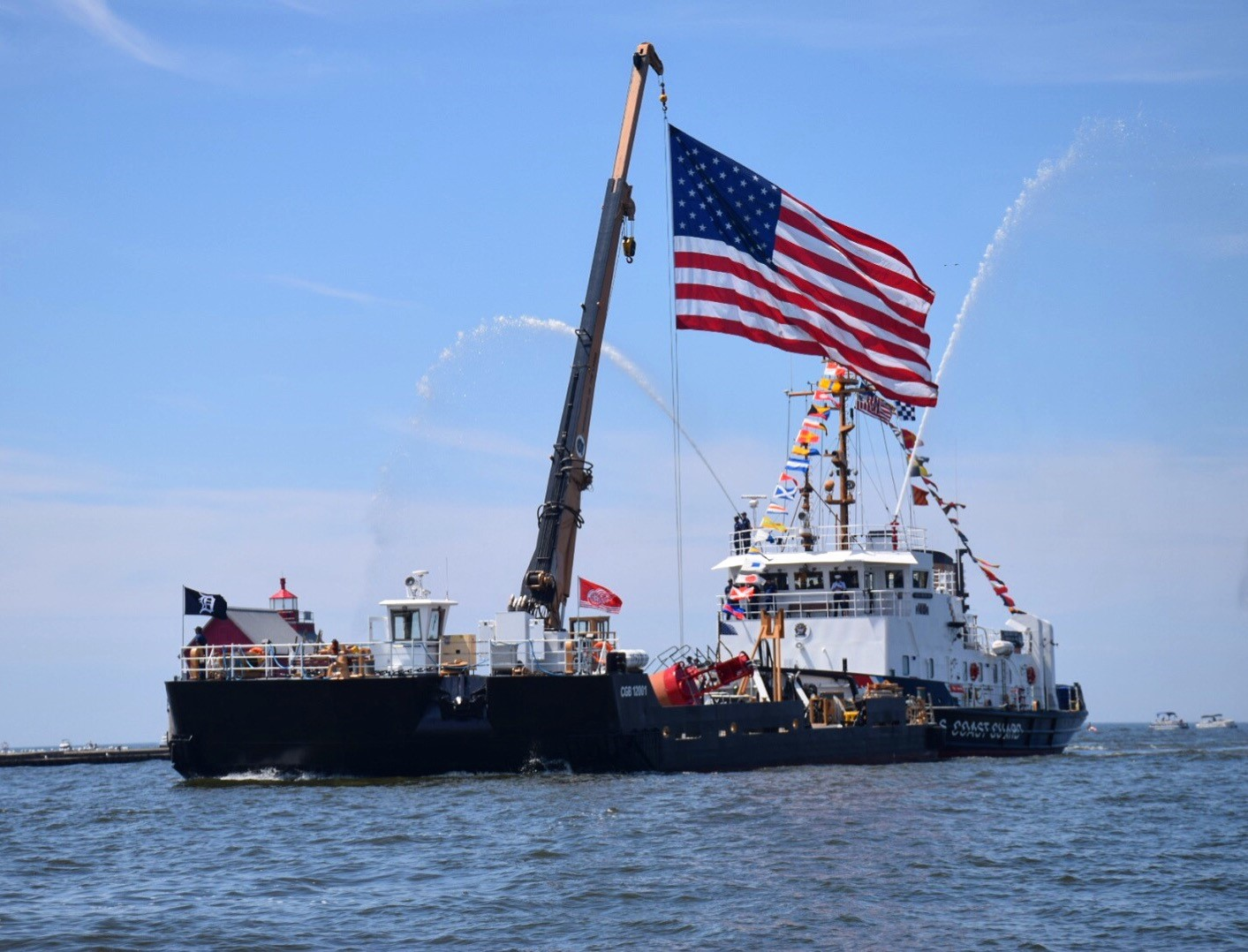
Ship entering the Grand Haven channel as part of the 2017 festival.

Coast Guard Festival is a festival in Grand Haven, Michigan. Founded in 1924, the festival is a ten-day event that starts in the last weekend in July, and ends in early August. Over 350,000 people attend the festival, including the nation's highest-ranking United States Coast Guard dignitaries from Washington, DC. The focus of the annual festival is to honor the Coast Guard and those who sacrificed their lives in the service of their country.

== History ==
The Festival unofficially began in 1924 as a Coast Guard personnel only picnic when the local Coast Guard station held rowing competitions for those service members stationed in Grand Haven. The first festival began in 1937. In August 1971 it was officially recognized as Grand Haven Coast Guard Festival, Inc. as a 501(c)3 charitable organization. Grand Haven was named "Coast Guard City, USA" by an Act of Congress and signed by the President of the United States on November 13, 1998.

== Photo Gallery ==
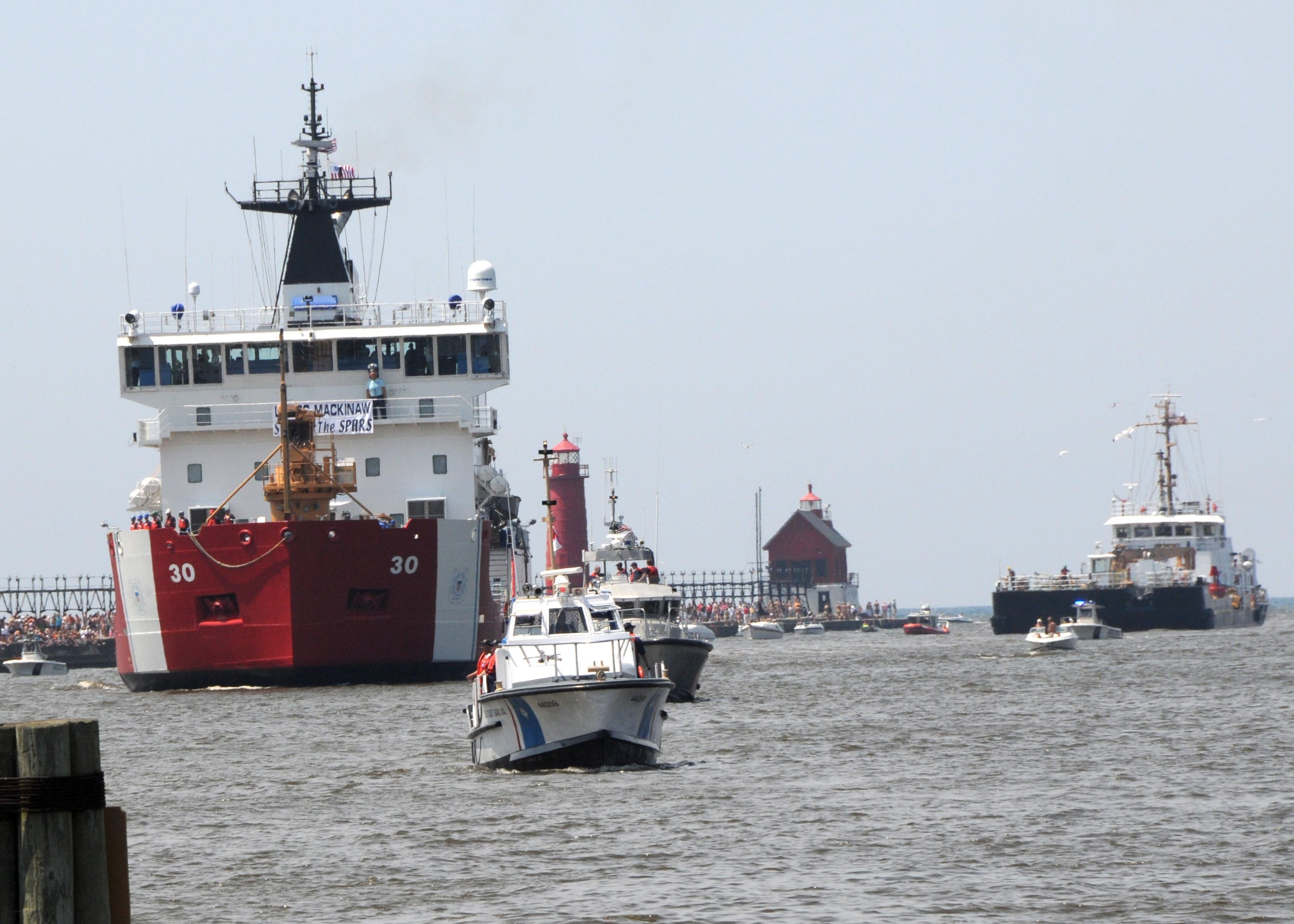
Ships entering Grand Haven during the festival's Parade of Ships

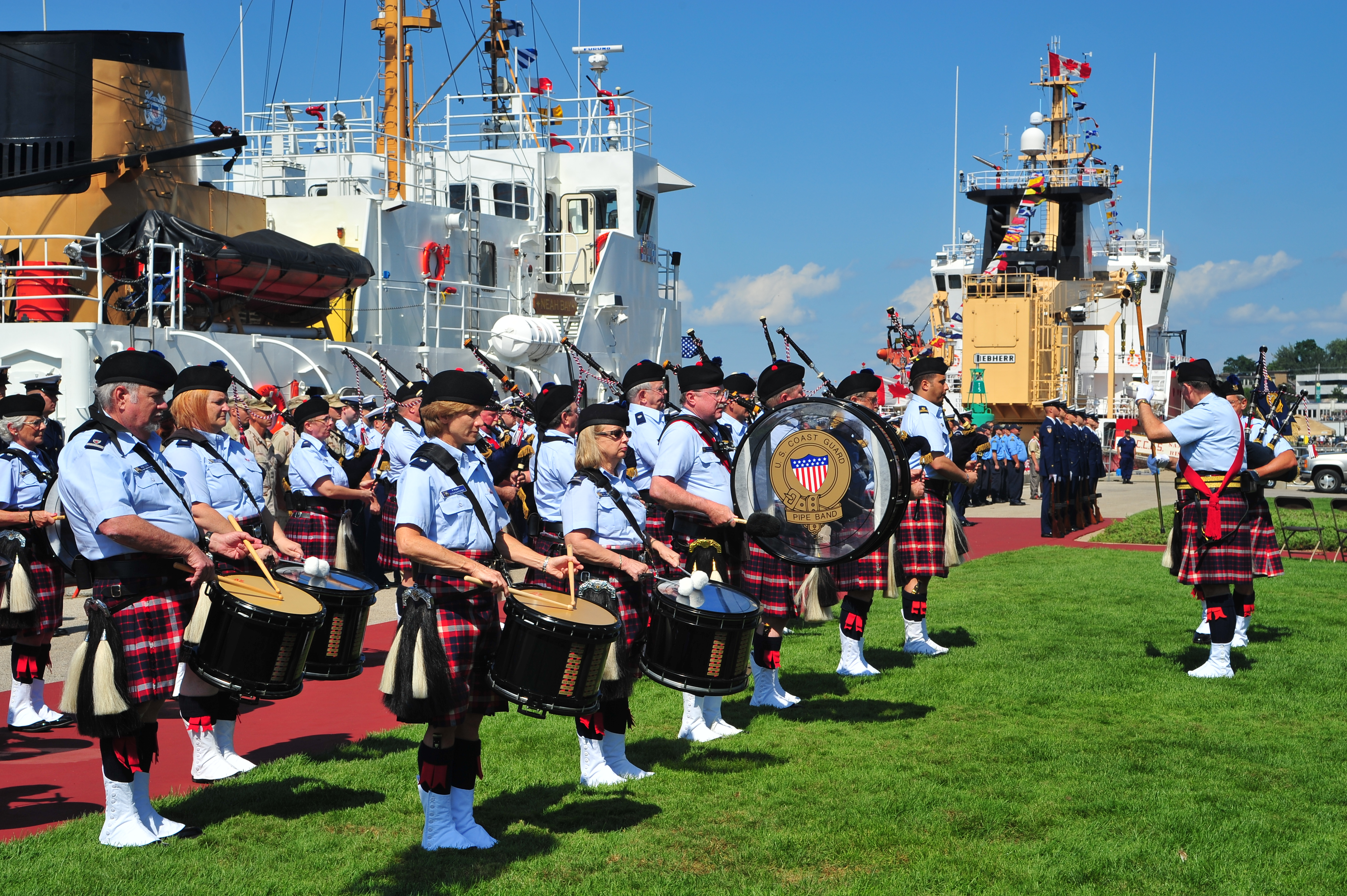
U.S. Coast Guard Pipe Band

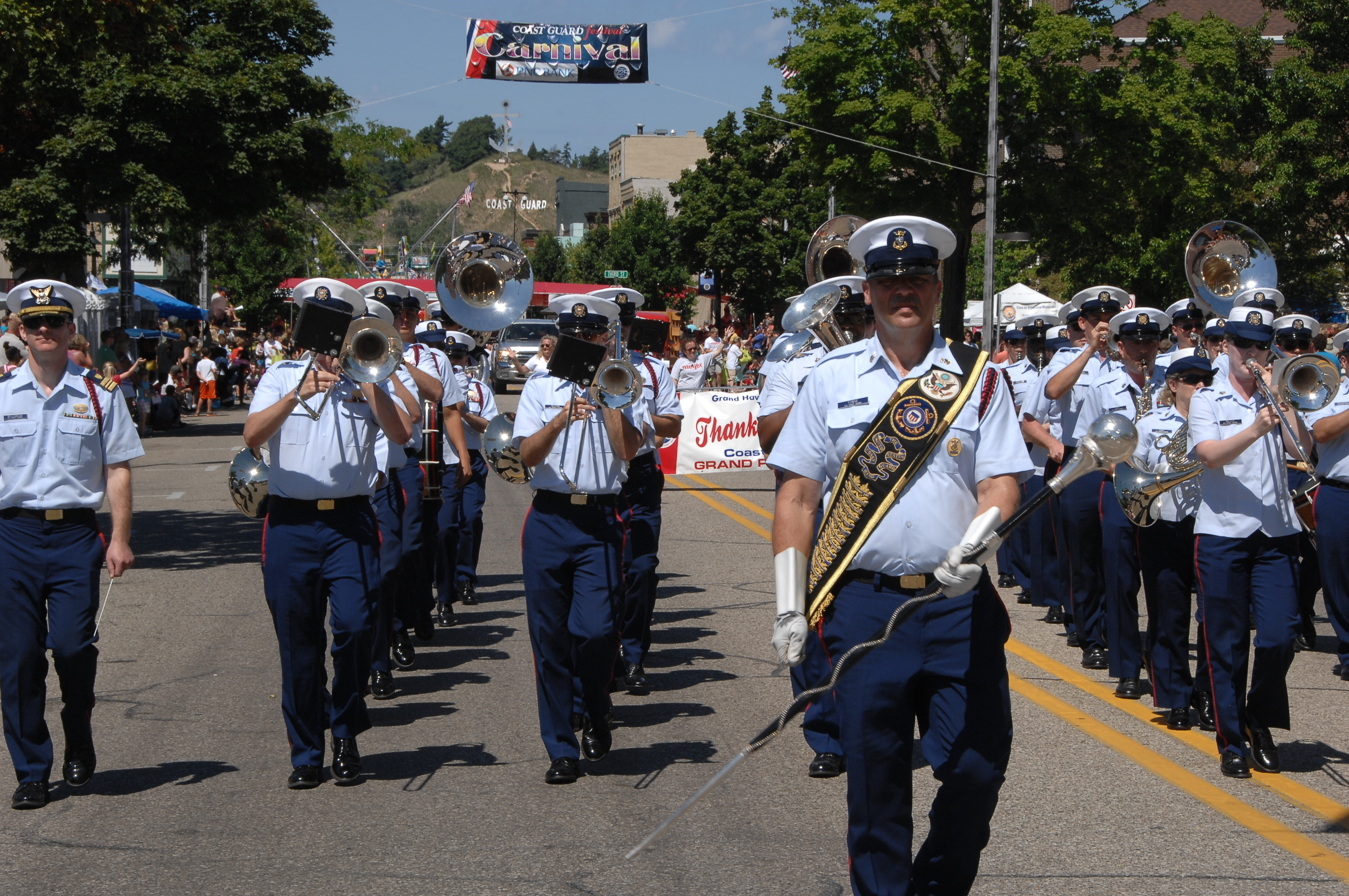
Coast Guard Festival Parade

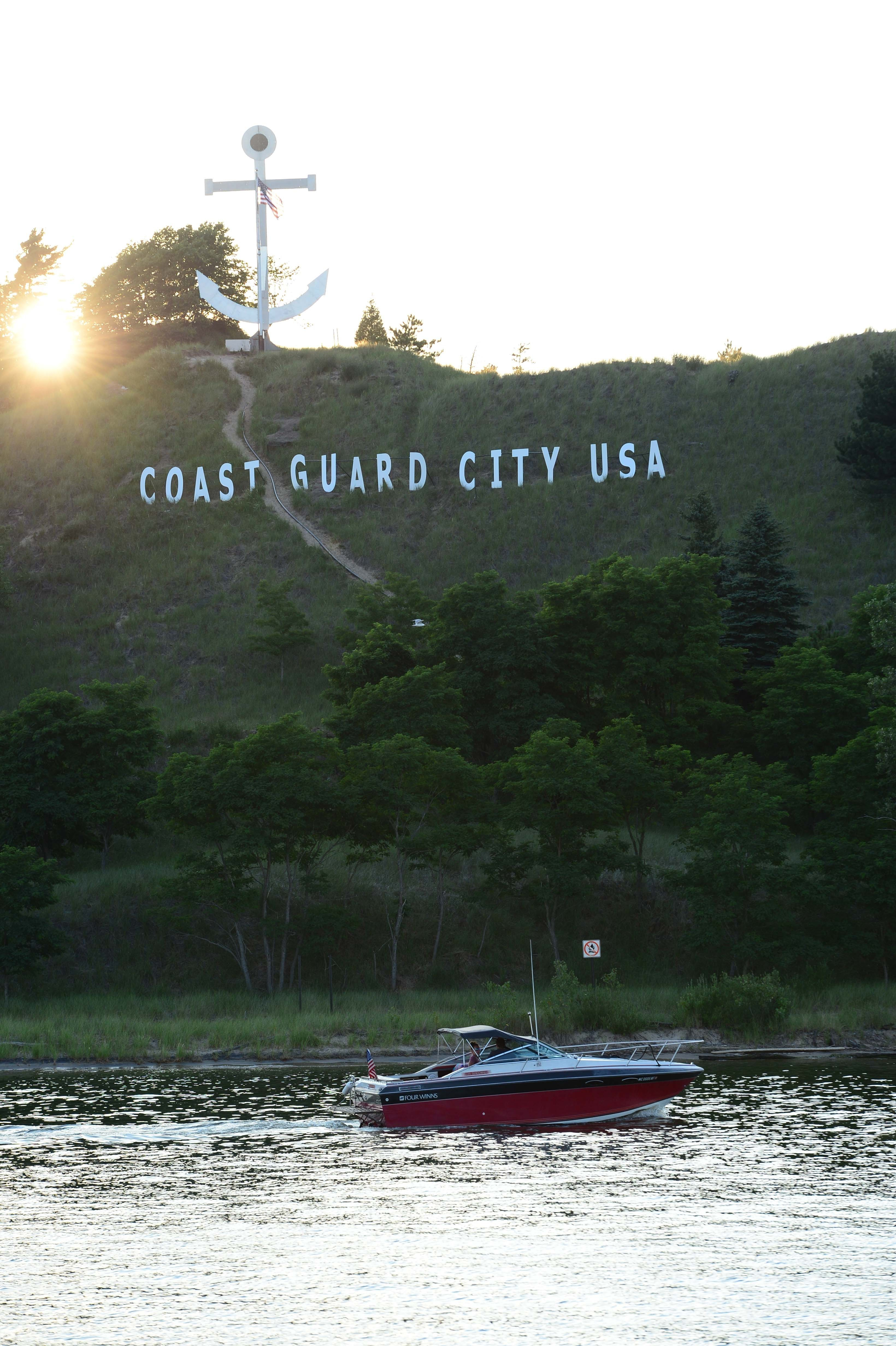
Coast Guard City USA sign on Dewey Hill
