= WBBL (disambiguation) =

The Women's Big Bash League (WBBL) is an Australian T20 Women's Cricket Competition.

WBBL may also refer to:

- Women's British Basketball League - the top women's basketball competition in the United Kingdom
- WBBL (FM), a radio station (96.5 FM) licensed to serve Richton, Mississippi, United States
- WLAW (AM), a radio station (1490 AM) licensed to serve Whitehall, Michigan, United States, which held the call sign WBBL from 2019 to 2021
- WTNR (FM), a radio station (107.3 FM) licensed to serve Greenville, Michigan, which held the call sign WBBL-FM from 2009 to 2019
- WJRW, a radio station (1340 AM) licensed to serve Grand Rapids, Michigan, which held the call sign WBBL from 1994 to 2009
- WBBL (AM), a radio station in Richmond, Virginia, United States, which broadcast from 1924 to 1989
- N-acetylglucosaminyl-diphospho-decaprenol L-rhamnosyltransferase, an enzyme
