= WKLQ =

WKLQ may refer to:

- WKLQ (FM), a radio station (94.5 FM) licensed to serve Holland, Michigan, United States
- WLAW (AM), a radio station (1490 AM) licensed to serve Whitehall, Michigan, which held the call sign WKLQ from 2009 to 2019
- WTNR (FM), a radio station (107.3 FM) licensed to serve Greenville, Michigan, which held the call sign WKLQ from 2004 to 2009
