= WLAW =

WLAW may refer to:

- WLAW (AM), a radio station (1490 AM) licensed to serve Whitehall, Michigan, United States
- WLAW-FM, a radio station (97.5 FM) licensed to serve Whitehall, Michigan
- WWSN (FM), a radio station (92.5 FM) licensed to serve Newaygo, Michigan, which held the call sign WLAW from 2006 to 2019
- WPLO, a radio station (610 AM) licensed to serve Grayson, Georgia, United States, which held the call sign WLAW from 1959 to 1987
- WRKO, a radio station (680 AM) licensed to serve Boston, Massachusetts, United States, which held the call sign WLAW from 1937 to 1953
- WLAW, a radio station (833 AM) licensed to serve New York, New York, United States, which held the call sign WLAW from 1922 until its deletion in 1924
