= WSHN =

WSHN may refer to:

- WSHN (FM), a radio station (89.3 FM) licensed to serve Munising, Michigan, United States
- WSHN (AM), a former radio station in Fremont, Michigan
- WVIB (100.1 FM), a radio station in Fremont, Michigan, which held the call sign WSHN-FM from 1971 to 2005
