= WWSN =

WWSN may refer to:

- WWSN (FM), a radio station (92.5 FM) licensed to serve Newaygo, Michigan, United States
- WLAW-FM, a radio station (97.5 FM) licensed to serve Whitehall, Michigan, which held the call sign WWSN from 2010 to 2019
- WQGA, a radio station (103.3 FM) licensed to serve Waycross, Georgia, United States, which held the call sign WWSN from 1998 to 2010
- WLNK, a radio station (107.9 FM) licensed to serve Charlotte, North Carolina, United States, which held the call sign WWSN from 1995 to 1997
- WKJK, a radio station (1080 AM) licensed to serve Louisville, Kentucky, United States, which held the call sign WWSN in 1993
- WMMX, a radio station (107.7 FM) licensed to serve Dayton, Ohio, United States, which held the call sign WWSN from 1985 to 1993
