= Fremont Area Community Foundation =

Philanthropic organization

Coordinates: 43°27′59.25″N 85°54′39.30″W

Fremont Area Community Foundation is a philanthropic organization in Fremont, Michigan. Founded in 1972 to serve the people of Newaygo County, it is one of the largest community foundations in the United States on a per capita basis, serving a population of 50,000 with net assets of approximately $218 million. It comprises more than 400 separate funds, and has two supporting organizations and three geographic affiliates.

== History ==
In 1972, the foundation was established with $10 million in assets, combining the funds of the private Fremont Foundation with other charitable funds such as Harry Williams, Frank Daniel Gerber, Dan & Dorothy Gerber, Marion & Charles Gerber, Gussie Gerber, Earle Johnson and William & Colleen Mee.

Between 1972 and 1994, the foundation grew its assets from $10 million to $65 million, granting approximately $2.5 million annually. In August 1994, the sale of the Gerber Products Company to Sandoz (now Novartis), of Switzerland, nearly doubled the assets of the foundation, which at the time owned 1.8 million shares of stock, bringing its total assets to $109 million overnight. From 1994 through the end of the century, the Foundation continued to grow, reaching almost $200 million in assets. Grant awards total approximately $10 million each year.

Since 1972, the Foundation has received $56 million in gifts and made $146 million in grants to benefit the Newaygo County area, a 261% return on donors’ dollars. In 2008, the Foundation made grants of $10.6 million.

== Leadership ==
The Fremont Community Foundation is under the direction of CEO Carla Roberts, COO Gregory Zerlaut, as well as 15 other trustees.

== Impact on the Community ==
The foundation has sponsored many community related programs and events, including the Newaygo County Hunger Initiative, a program that in 2008 distributed 1.65 million pounds of food to low income residents in Newaygo County, the West Michigan Student Showcase, a regional talent show for several hundred area high school students, and in support of tax breaks to the Gerber Products Company, the foundation approved a grant to the City of Fremont to cover lost tax revenues of $525,000 in order to help retain the county's largest employer, as well as ensure the financial health of the city.

The foundation has also support many building programs in Newaygo County, such as the construction of Gerber Memorial's $8.3 million Tamarac Center, which will further improve the health and wellness of area residents.

=== Youth Advisory Committee ===
The Youth Advisory Committee (YAC) advises the Board of Directors on grants and issues regarding area youth. YAC members are selected from all Newaygo County High Schools and in 2008 the total Youth Endowment Fund grants were $81,884.

=== Amazing X Charitable Trust ===
The Amazing X Charitable Trust Board advises the Board of Directors on grants that are to benefit people in Newaygo County with disabilities. In 2008 the total Amazing X Charitable Trust grants were $301,379.

=== Elderly Needs Fund ===
The Elderly Needs Fund Board provides grants to benefit the elderly in Newaygo County. In 2008 the total Elderly Needs Fund grants were $493,630.

== Speaker Series ==
The foundation's Speaker Series often invites people to come and speak on at free public events on various issues and subjects. These events are usually held at the Dogwood Center for the Performing Arts or larger events are held at the Grant Fine Arts Center.
