= WTNR =

WTNR may refer to:

- WTNR (FM), a radio station (107.3 FM) licensed to serve Greenville, Michigan, United States
- WKLQ (FM), a radio station (94.5 FM) licensed to serve Holland, Michigan, which held the call sign WTNR from 2004 to 2019
- WWON (AM), a radio station (930 AM) licensed to serve Waynesboro, Tennessee, United States, which held the call sign WTNR from 1987 to 2000
- WVVB (AM), a radio station (1410 AM) licensed to serve Kingston, Tennessee, which held the call sign WTNR beginning in 1978
