= Fremont, Michigan =

- City
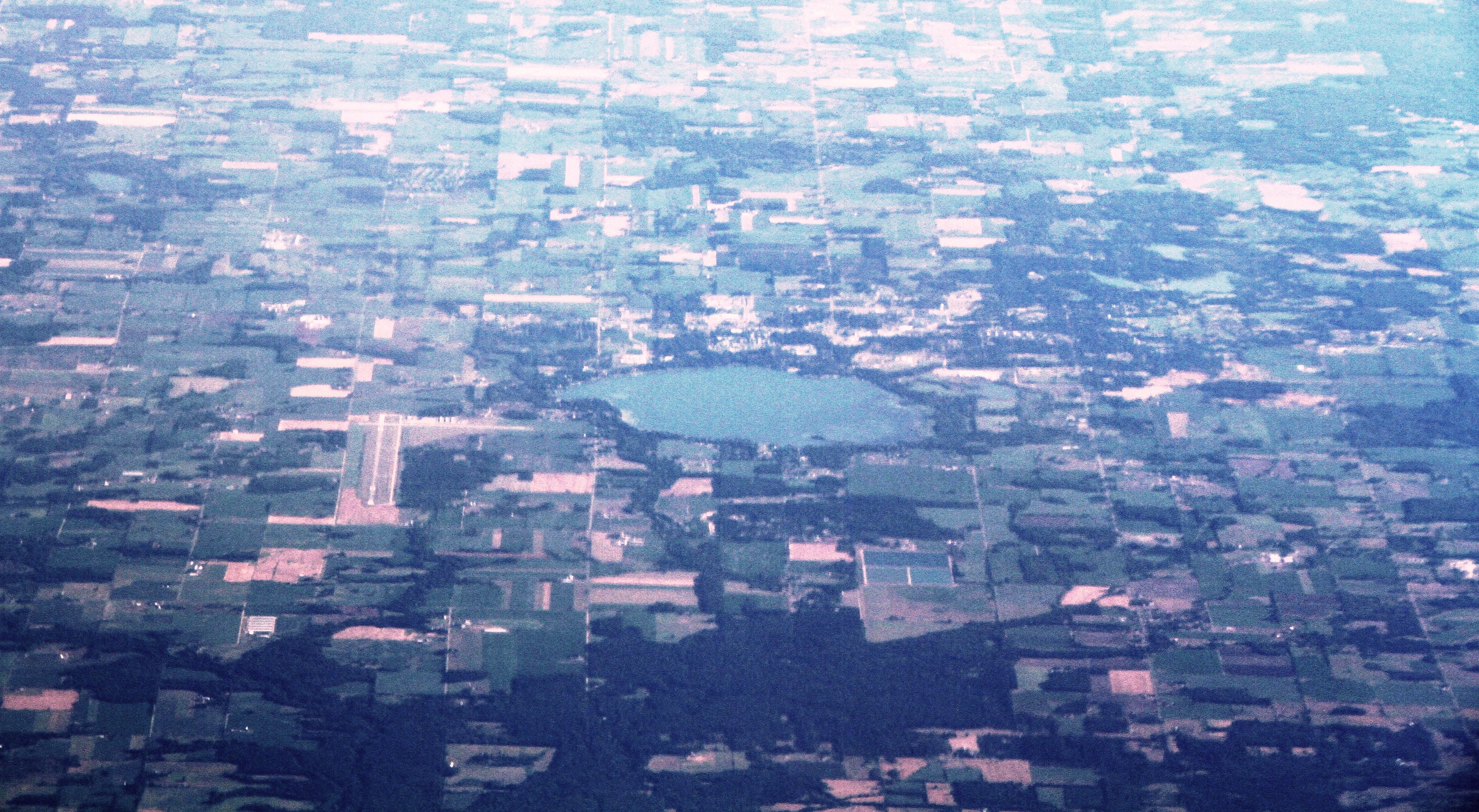
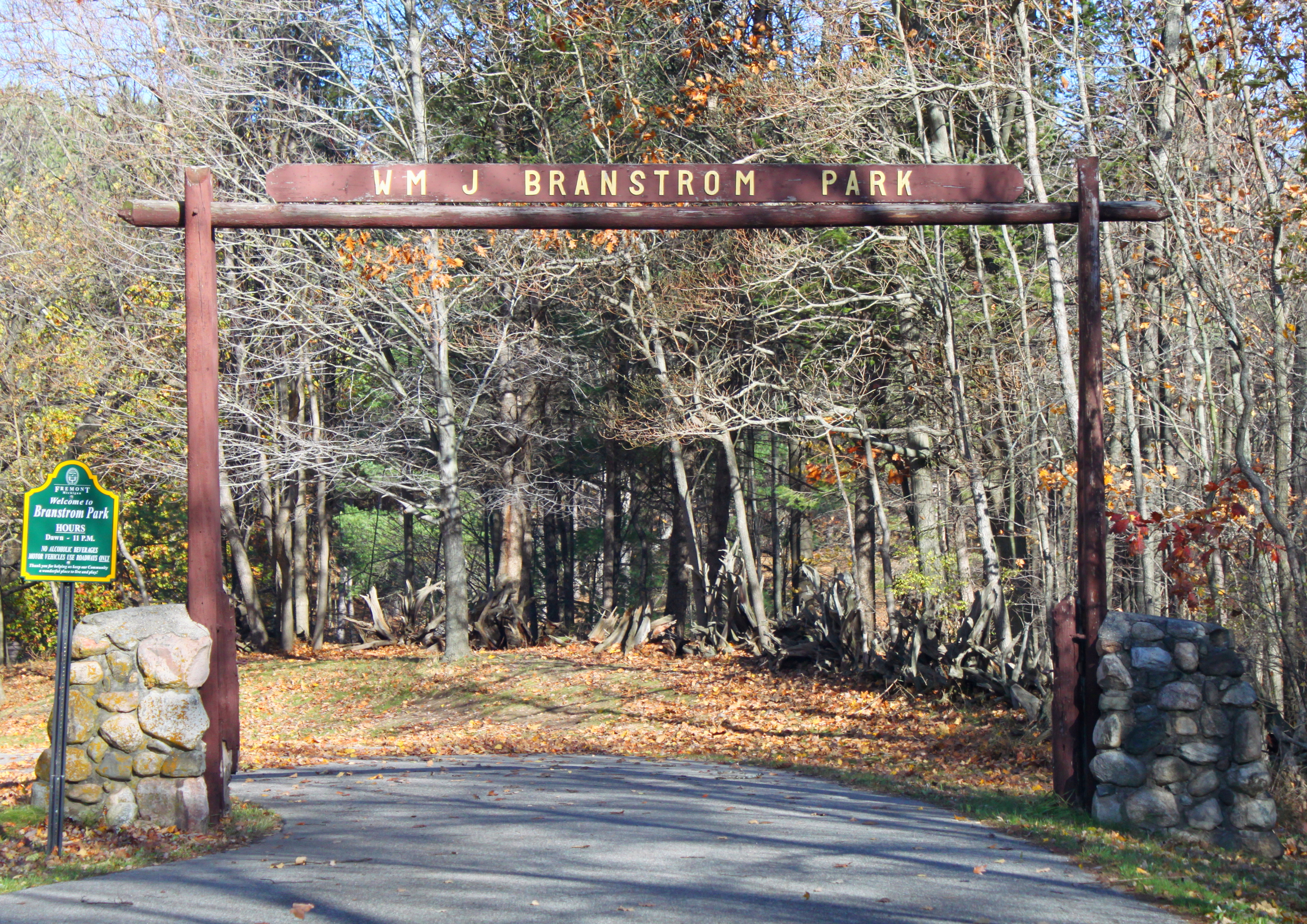
- Aerial view from the south towards north Entrance To Branstrom Park
- Motto(s): "Now And Always - A Fine City, A Great Community"
- Coordinates: 43°28′0″N 85°56′54″W
- Country: United States
- State: Michigan
- County: Newaygo
- Settled: 1855

Area
  - Total: 4.90 sq mi (12.68 km^{2})
  - Land: 3.60 sq mi (9.33 km^{2})
  - Water: 1.29 sq mi (3.35 km^{2})
- Elevation: 817 ft (249 m)

Population (2020)
  - Total: 4,516
  - Density: 1,253.9/sq mi (484.14/km^{2})
- Time zone: UTC-5 (Eastern (EST))
  - Summer (DST): UTC-4 (EDT)
- ZIP codes: 49412-49413
- Area code: 231
- FIPS code: 26-30700
- GNIS feature ID: 0626466
- Website: www.cityoffremont.net

Fremont is a city in Newaygo County, Michigan, United States. The population was 4,516 at the time of the 2020 census.

== History ==
The first inhabitants of the Fremont area were Native Americans. A group of settlers led by Daniel Weaver first settled the area in 1855, with the Weaver homestead serving as the first post office and public school. In November 1855, Fremont Township was established and named in honor of John C. Frémont, western explorer and Republican Party candidate for United States President. Weaver and his fellow settlers cleared the dense timber in order to farm. Early in the 1870s, Dutch immigrant families came from Holland and Muskegon, Michigan; and Fremont continues to recognize its early Dutch heritage in local festivals and pageants.

Due to rich stands of virgin timber, lumbering became a major industry, and a railroad spur soon linked Fremont to the national rail network. The lumbering industry declined in the 1860s because of the American Civil War; and in 1871, Fremont experienced a major forest fire that caused extensive damage, especially to the lumber mills. Nevertheless, Fremont rebuilt and was even able to supply some lumber to rebuild Chicago after the Great Fire of 1871.

== Geography ==
According to the United States Census Bureau, the city has a total area of 4.72 square miles (12.22 km^{2}), of which 3.42 square miles (8.86 km^{2}) is land and 1.30 square miles (3.37 km^{2}) is water.

== Climate ==
Climate data for Fremont 4 WSW, MI
Month	Jan	Feb	Mar	Apr	May	Jun	Jul	Aug	Sep	Oct	Nov	Dec	Year
Mean daily maximum °F (°C)	29.6 (−1.3)	31.8 (−0.1)	42 (6)	54.8 (12.7)	66.7 (19.3)	76.2 (24.6)	79.7 (26.5)	77.9 (25.5)	71.4 (21.9)	58.7 (14.8)	44.9 (7.2)	34.4 (1.3)	55.7 (13.2)
Mean daily minimum °F (°C)	15.7 (−9.1)	16.2 (−8.8)	23.3 (−4.8)	33.4 (0.8)	44.4 (6.9)	54.3 (12.4)	57.8 (14.3)	56.4 (13.6)	50 (10)	39.1 (3.9)	29.7 (−1.3)	21.5 (−5.8)	36.8 (2.7)
Average precipitation inches (mm)	2.45 (62)	1.86 (47)	2.41 (61)	3.76 (96)	3.88 (99)	3.59 (91)	3.27 (83)	3.40 (86)	3.36 (85)	4.09 (104)	3.09 (78)	2.49 (63)	37.65 (955)
Average snowfall inches (cm)	22 (56)	16 (41)	8 (20)	2 (5.1)	0 (0)	0 (0)	0 (0)	0 (0)	0 (0)	0.2 (0.51)	6 (15)	21 (53)	75.2 (190.61)
Source: NOAA

== Demographics ==
Historical population
Census	Pop.	Note	%±
1880	902		—
1890	1,097		21.6%
1900	1,331		21.3%
1910	2,009		50.9%
1920	2,180		8.5%
1930	2,157		−1.1%
1940	2,520		16.8%
1950	3,056		21.3%
1960	3,384		10.7%
1970	3,465		2.4%
1980	3,672		6.0%
1990	3,875		5.5%
2000	4,224		9.0%
2010	4,081		−3.4%
2020	4,516		10.7%
U.S. Decennial Census

=== 2020 census ===
As of the 2020 census, Fremont had a population of 4,516. The median age was 40.1 years. 23.7% of residents were under the age of 18 and 23.7% of residents were 65 years of age or older. For every 100 females there were 83.4 males, and for every 100 females age 18 and over there were 78.9 males age 18 and over.

98.9% of residents lived in urban areas, while 1.1% lived in rural areas.

There were 1,963 households in Fremont, of which 26.9% had children under the age of 18 living in them. Of all households, 40.6% were married-couple households, 16.6% were households with a male householder and no spouse or partner present, and 36.5% were households with a female householder and no spouse or partner present. About 37.4% of all households were made up of individuals and 19.6% had someone living alone who was 65 years of age or older.

There were 2,103 housing units, of which 6.7% were vacant. The homeowner vacancy rate was 1.3% and the rental vacancy rate was 6.6%.

Racial composition as of the 2020 census
Race	Number	Percent
White	4,113	91.1%
Black or African American	13	0.3%
American Indian and Alaska Native	16	0.4%
Asian	35	0.8%
Native Hawaiian and Other Pacific Islander	1	0.0%
Some other race	79	1.7%
Two or more races	259	5.7%
Hispanic or Latino (of any race)	222	4.9%

=== 2010 census ===
As of the census of 2010, there were 4,081 people, 1,781 households, and 1,107 families living in the city. The population density was 1,193.3 inhabitants per square mile (460.7/km^{2}). There were 1,968 housing units at an average density of 575.4 per square mile (222.2/km^{2}). The racial makeup of the city was 94.5% White, 0.5% African American, 0.3% Native American, 1.1% Asian, 0.1% Pacific Islander, 2.2% from other races, and 1.3% from two or more races. Hispanic or Latino of any race were 4.6% of the population.

There were 1,781 households, of which 29.4% had children under the age of 18 living with them, 43.6% were married couples living together, 14.8% had a female householder with no husband present, 3.8% had a male householder with no wife present, and 37.8% were non-families. 33.5% of all households were made up of individuals, and 14.7% had someone living alone who was 65 years of age or older. The average household size was 2.27 and the average family size was 2.88.

The median age in the city was 39.5 years. 25.1% of residents were under the age of 18; 8.3% were between the ages of 18 and 24; 22.8% were from 25 to 44; 24.6% were from 45 to 64; and 19.4% were 65 years of age or older. The gender makeup of the city was 44.7% male and 55.3% female.

=== 2000 census ===
As of the census of 2000, there were 4,224 people, 1,788 households, and 1,140 families living in the city. The population density was 1,268.3 inhabitants per square mile (489.7/km^{2}). There were 1,943 housing units at an average density of 583.4 per square mile (225.3/km^{2}). The racial makeup of the city was 96.59% White, 0.38% African American, 0.50% Native American, 0.99% Asian, 0.05% Pacific Islander, 0.47% from other races, and 1.02% from two or more races. Hispanic or Latino of any race were 1.96% of the population.

There were 1,788 households, out of which 30.1% had children under the age of 18 living with them, 50.0% were married couples living together, 11.4% had a female householder with no husband present, and 36.2% were non-families. 32.4% of all households were made up of individuals, and 16.9% had someone living alone who was 65 years of age or older. The average household size was 2.34 and the average family size was 2.97.

In the city, the population was spread out, with 26.9% under the age of 18, 7.9% from 18 to 24, 25.2% from 25 to 44, 20.4% from 45 to 64, and 19.6% who were 65 years of age or older. The median age was 37 years. For every 100 females, there were 82.2 males. For every 100 females age 18 and over, there were 76.4 males.

The median income for a household in the city was $32,246, and the median income for a family was $42,578. Males had a median income of $37,872 versus $23,203 for females. The per capita income for the city was $19,475. About 8.8% of families and 12.2% of the population were below the poverty line, including 20.0% of those under age 18 and 7.5% of those age 65 or over.

== Economy ==
Gerber Products Company is located in Fremont. The Gerber Products Company was originally started as the Fremont Canning Company. Fremont is known as "The Baby Food Capital of the World". Fremont holds the annual National Baby Food Festival every third week of July, where over 50,000 people visit Fremont every year.

== Media ==
=== FM ===
Call Sign	Frequency	Format	City Broadcast From
WWSN	92.5	Adult Contemporary	Newaygo, Michigan
WWKR	94.1	Classic Rock	Hart, Michigan
WLCS	98.3	Classic Hits	North Muskegon, Michigan
WVIB	100.1	Urban Contemporary	Holton, Michigan
WMRR	101.7	Classic Rock	Muskegon Heights, Michigan
WYBR	102.3	Hot AC	Big Rapids, Michigan
WSNX	104.5	Top 40	Muskegon, Michigan
WHTS	105.3	Top 40	Coopersville, Michigan
WOOD	106.9	Talk/News	Muskegon, Michigan
WMUS	107.9	Country	Muskegon, Michigan

== Infrastructure ==
=== Transportation ===
- M-82
- M-120
- B-31
- B-35
- B-86

== Notable people ==
- Lola Blanc, American singer and model.
- Theodore I. Fry, Michigan State Treasurer.
- Dan Gerber, American poet.
- Frank Daniel Gerber, founder of the Fremont Canning Company, and later the Gerber Products Company.
- Alex Gorsky, CEO of Johnson & Johnson.
- Bert Zagers, former running back and defensive back for the Washington Redskins of the National Football League.
