= Sally Gerber =

American businessman (born 1927)

Sally Scott Gerber (born March 26, 1927) is the daughter of Daniel Frank Gerber who established the baby food enterprise Gerber Products Company.

Sally Gerber was ill as a baby, and when she was seven months old, her pediatrician recommended a diet of fruits and vegetables which her mother prepared for her daily. Her mother Dorothy soon grew tired of hand-straining fruits and vegetables every day. She turned to her husband "Dan", owner of the Fremont Canning Company along with his father Frank Daniel Gerber, for help.

In October 1948, she married Robert Hopewell Phinny. Her son, Peter Tyler Phinny, predeceased her in 2021.

== Sources ==
- Avakian, Arlene Voski et al., From Betty Crocker to Feminist Food Studies, Liverpool University Press (2005), ISBN 1-55849-511-8
- Belasco, Warren James et al., Food Nations, Routledge (2002), ISBN 0-415-93077-4
- Ingham, John N., Biographical Dictionary of American Business Leaders: A-G, Greenwood Publishing Group (1983), ISBN 0-313-23907-X
