= WVIB =

Radio station in Holton, Michigan

Coordinates: 43.314°N 86.155°W

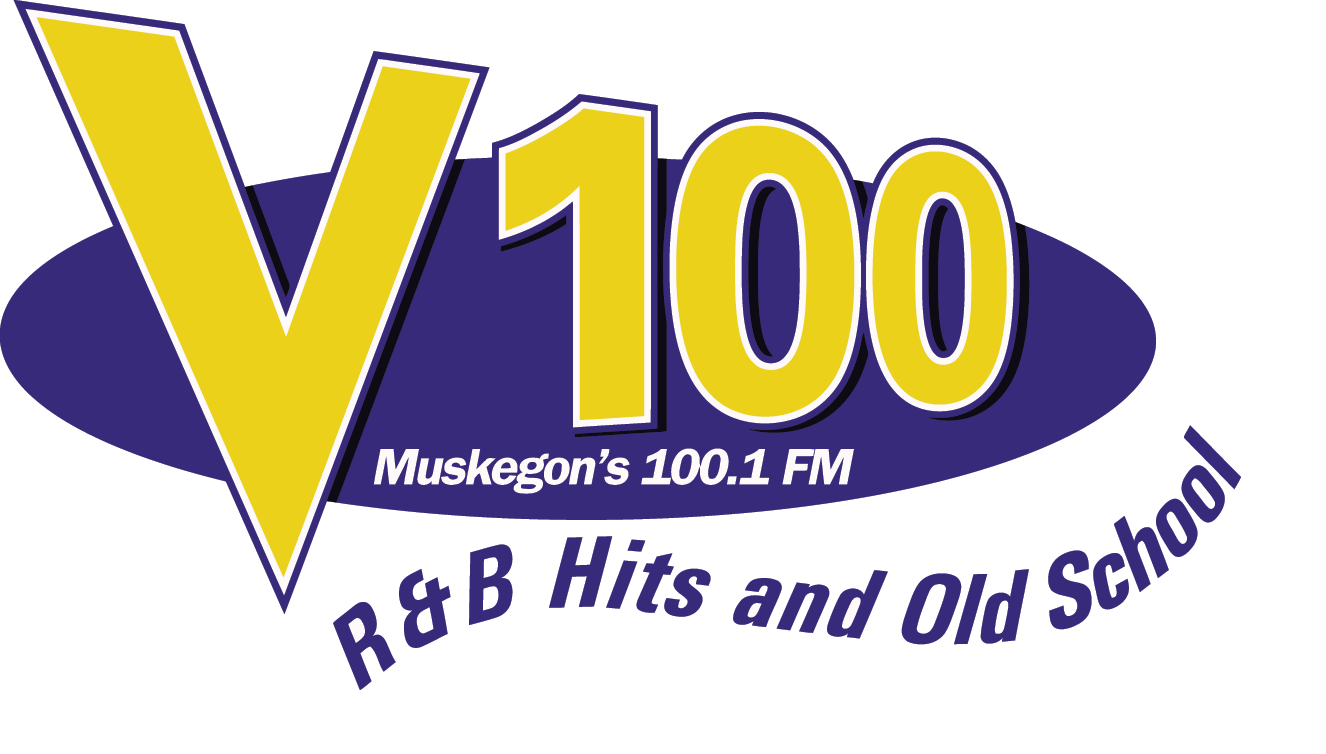
- Holton, Michigan; United States
- Broadcast area: Muskegon, Michigan
- Frequency: 100.1 MHz
- Branding: V100

Programming
- Format: Urban adult contemporary
- Affiliations: The Steve Harvey Morning Show (Premiere Networks); The Touch (Westwood One)

Ownership
- Owner: Cumulus Media; (Radio License Holding CBC, LLC)
- Sister stations: WLCS; WWSN

History
- First air date: 1971 (as WSHN-FM)
- Former call signs: WSHN-FM (1971–2005)

Technical information
- Licensing authority: FCC
- Facility ID: 73994
- Class: A
- ERP: 2,900 watts
- HAAT: 144 meters (472 ft)

Links
- Public license information: Public file; LMS
- Webcast: Listen live
- Website: www.v100fm.com

WVIB (100.1 FM, "V100") is a radio station broadcasting an urban adult contemporary format fed via satellite from Westwood One (known as "The Touch" or "Today's R&B and Old School"). The station is licensed to Holton, Michigan and serves the Muskegon market. It can be heard as far south as Allendale, Michigan, as far east as Lakeview, Michigan, and as far north as Ludington, Michigan. However, its range is limited by WBCH to the southeast and WSJP-FM to the west.

== History ==
The station began in 1971 as WSHN-FM in Fremont, Michigan, which for many years featured a country format (as "Fun Country 100 FM") oriented toward Fremont and Newaygo County. The WSHN calls, shared with WSHN (1550 AM), stood for Stuart and Helene Noordyk, the station's original owners.

In January 2002, the Noordyks were granted a construction permit to change WSHN-FM's city of license from Fremont to Holton and move into the Muskegon market (WSHN AM remained in Fremont). The following month, "Fun Country 100" became "The New Sunny FM" with a hot AC format. The station chose the name "The New Sunny FM" to evoke memories of WSNX's days as "Sunny FM" during the 1980s and 1990s. The intention was to provide a "grown-up" version of "Sunny FM", without hip hop and rap music and with classic 1980s and 1990s hits mixed in. However, the revamped "Sunny FM" was a ratings failure.

In February 2004, Tony "Boomer" Burke, former on-air talent for Grand Rapids active rock station WKLQ and South Bend's CHR/Top 40 station U-93 WNDV, was hired as program director and weekday afternoon host for "Sunny-FM". "Boomer"'s duties also included heading up the other Noordyk stations (WEFG-FM, WLCS, WSHN AM). In an attempt to push the station into direct competition with WSNX, WSHN-FM's music format quickly evolved from Hot AC to CHR/Top 40, aiming directly at teens and young adults just in time for summer.

By June 2004, "100.1 The New Sunny-FM" had a fresh new sound. "Boomer" had added rap and hip hop music in a limited capacity compared to WSNX. Intense song rotation was given to current and recent hits as well as music from the early 2000s. Selected Top 40 hits from the 1990s remained, but very limited. 1980s songs were dropped altogether other than during special programming and syndicated programming. All this was an effort to try to bring in the 12–24 and 18–34 male-female demographic. A tweaked moniker and logo, a new voice-over by Jeff Straub complete with brand new fast-paced imaging and jingles, as well as new air talent, helped kick off WSHN's Top 40 effort in June 2004. This coincided with the week-long Muskegon Summer Celebration. Taking advantage of the timing, the station sponsored Nickelback, who performed in concert during the week-long festival. In June, changes in staff also were made, including revamping the morning show. "Boomer" replaced owner Don Noordyk on the morning team. Noordyk stepped back to focus exclusively on managerial duties. Brandon James was hired to replace "Boomer" as Weekday Afternoon Host to help continue the Top 40 approach and improve listener interaction. Along with several new contests and show features, Brandon's show was request and caller driven. A new Friday evening show titled Mix at Six also debuted, featuring a full hour of Modern Dance and club music.

In August 2004, these efforts too were proven not to be long-lived at Sunny-FM. Creative differences between talent and management over the direction of music decisions led to the departure of Tony "Boomer" Burke and Brandon James, who both resigned on the same day in late August. WSHN pretty much reverted to its adult-driven Hot AC format until November.

After Citadel Broadcasting took over the station in November 2004, 100.1 FM was switched to an adult-urban format, which has proven popular among the African American community in Muskegon. Citadel merged with Cumulus Media on September 16, 2011.

WVIB is the only commercial radio station in the Muskegon area programmed for the black community. It competes with non-commercial LPFM stations WUVS-LP and WUGM-LP.
