= WLAW (AM) =

Radio station in Whitehall, Michigan

Coordinates: 43°23′3″N 86°19′31.2″W

- Whitehall, Michigan; United States
- Broadcast area: Muskegon, Michigan
- Frequency: 1490 kHz
- Branding: 97.5 Nash Icon

Programming
- Format: Country

Ownership
- Owner: Cumulus Media; (Radio License Holding CBC, LLC)
- Sister stations: WLCS; WVIB; WLAW-FM

History
- First air date: 1955 (as WBFC)
- Last air date: March 14, 2025
- Former call signs: WBFC (1955–1959); WCBQ (1959–1964); WLRC (1964–1979); WLRQ (1979–1981); WPBK (1981–1992); WEFG (1992–1998); WUBR (1998–2005); WODJ (2005–2009); WKLQ (2009–2019); WBBL (2019–2021)

Technical information
- Licensing authority: FCC
- Facility ID: 53962
- Class: C
- Power: 1,000 watts unlimited
- Translator: 99.1 W256DM (Whitehall)

Links
- Public license information: Public file; LMS

WLAW (1490 kHz) was an AM radio station licensed to Whitehall, Michigan. The station last simulcast sister station WLAW-FM, and was owned by Cumulus Media.

As WUBR ("The Bear"), the station played adult standards. Later, the format changed to sports, carrying ESPN Radio. In December 2005, the station switched to a talk format as WODJ (later becoming WKLQ), but returned to sports in simulcast with WJRW, under the WBBL call sign, following the January 2019 discontinuation of WBBL-FM's sports format.

On August 24, 2021, the station changed its call sign to WLAW and then, on August 30, 2021, changed to a simulcast of WLAW-FM, a country music station under the "Nash Icon" branding.

WLAW and WLAW-FM went silent in March 2025. They were two of 11 Cumulus stations to close the weekend of March 14, as part of a larger shutdown of underperforming Cumulus stations. The WLAW stations' tower leases were rejected as part of Cumulus's chapter 11 bankruptcy in March 2026, and the Federal Communications Commission cancelled the WLAW license on March 12, 2026.
