= Frank Daniel Gerber =

American manufacturer of baby food

- Born: July 12, 1873; Douglas, Michigan
- Died: October 7, 1952 (aged 79); Fremont, Michigan
- Occupation: Baby food manufacturer
- Spouse: Pauline Dora Platt
- Parent(s): Joseph Daniel Gerber; Agnes Mayer

Frank Daniel Gerber (July 12, 1873 – October 7, 1952) was an American manufacturer of baby food.

== Early life ==
Gerber was born in the town of Douglas in Allegan County, Michigan, in 1873. He graduated from Fremont High School of Western Michigan in 1887. He attended Valparaiso Normal School in Valparaiso, Indiana, for one year, to learn to become a teacher.

Gerber’s father owned a tannery and Gerber joined his father’s firm when he was sixteen. Gerber became a partner of the firm within five years and managed it until it closed in 1905.

== Career ==
Gerber founded Fremont Canning Company in 1901 with his father to market local produce for the farmers. They canned peas, beans, and fruits on a seasonal basis. This company was the basis of the baby food industry.

Gerber became president of Fremont Canning Company in 1917 when his father died. His first year as president of the firm, Gerber had sales that exceeded one million dollars. Gerber expanded the facilities for year-round production in 1914–1915. Gerber's son Daniel joined the canning company in 1920 and became assistant general manager in 1926.

Gerber had a sickly granddaughter named Sally, born in 1927. Her mother Dorothy (Daniel's wife) would strain fruits and vegetables for her by hand as a pediatrician had recommended. After getting tired of this, she suggested to her husband Daniel that if his company could make tomato puree, perhaps they could make strained peas.

Daniel then suggested to his father that they should look into making baby food. Gerber experimented with test batches of strained baby food on baby Sally and other babies in the summer of 1927. Gerber also researched marketing possibilities.

Gerber began selling baby food through the canning company in 1928, using the "Gerber Baby" as their logo symbol. The baby food was sold at fifteen cents each, much less than similar foods which were purchased through drug stores for forty to sixty cents.

Some twelve years later the baby food line was outselling the adult canned food products. The name was changed to Gerber Products Company in 1941, and in 1943 Gerber stopped making canned foods for adults.

== Later life ==
Gerber died in 1952 and the firm was taken over by his son, Daniel Frank Gerber.
