= WSHN (AM) =

Radio station in Fremont, Michigan (1961–2012)

- Fremont, Michigan; United States
- Broadcast area: Muskegon, Michigan
- Frequency: 1550 kHz

Programming
- Format: News/talk

Ownership
- Owner: Noordyk Broadcasting

History
- First air date: May 23, 1961
- Last air date: October 5, 2012
- Former call signs: WSHN (1961–1985); WMIV (1985–1988); WSHN (1988–2012)
- Call sign meaning: Stuart and Helene Noordyk

Technical information
- Facility ID: 73993
- Class: D
- Power: 1,000 watts (day)
- Transmitter coordinates: 43°28′15″N 85°56′25″W

WSHN (1550 AM) was a radio station licensed to serve Fremont, Michigan, United States. The station ran 1,000 watts, during daytime hours only.

== History ==
WSHN began broadcasting May 23, 1961, and was owned by Rev. Stuart P. Noordyk.

On October 5, 2012, the Federal Communications Commission cancelled WSHN's license and deleted the station's call sign from its database.
