= WHTS =

Coopersville, Michigan; United States
- Broadcast area: Grand Rapids-Muskegon
- Frequency: 105.3 MHz
- Branding: 105.3 Hot FM

Programming
- Format: Contemporary hits
- Affiliations: Westwood One

Ownership
- Owner: Cumulus Media; (Radio License Holding CBC, LLC)
- Sister stations: WTNR, WJRW, WKLQ, WLAV-FM, WWSN

History
- First air date: 1984
- Former call signs: WCXT (1984–2006)
- Call sign meaning: Hot or Hits

Technical information
- Facility ID: 71090
- Class: B
- ERP: 20,000 watts
- HAAT: 242 meters (794 ft)
- Transmitter coordinates: 43°18′35.1″N 85°54′45.2″W

Links
- Webcast: Listen live
- Website: 1053hotfm.com

WHTS (105.3 FM) is a commercial radio station licensed to Coopersville, Michigan, and serving the Grand Rapids metropolitan area. It airs a contemporary hit format and is owned by Cumulus Media. The studios are on Monroe Center Street NW in Grand Rapids.

WHTS's transmitter is sited on Alger Road at West 136th Street in Ashland Township, Michigan.

== History ==
The station signed on the air in 1984. Its original city of license was Hart, Michigan, and its first call sign was WCXT. It had an effective radiated power of 100,000 watts, the maximum permitted for most FM stations. The signal covered a large amount of West Michigan. Although the station mentioned Hart, Muskegon, Ludington and Grand Haven in its top-of-the-hour station identification, it could be heard clearly out to Manistee, Big Rapids, and Holland, and across Lake Michigan in Wisconsin. The original owner was Waters Broadcasting.

WCXT had various rock formats, including ABC's heavy metal Z-Rock music service. In 1988, it shifted to Soft Adult Contemporary as "Light Mix 105.3." As an AC station, WCXT was mostly automated and voice-tracked except for morning drive time, which was hosted by Mark Waters (son of the station's owner Nancy Waters).

On July 2, 1999, control of the station was transferred under a Local Marketing Agreement (LMA) to Harbor Pointe Entertainment, which then switched the format to rhythmic contemporary and dance music as "105.3 The Whip," targeting the Grand Rapids market. 105.3 The Whip played dance mixes of CHR and Rhythmic CHR hits with a scattering of hits from Billboard's dance music charts. A call letter change to WWIP was planned, but never happened.

In the fall of 1999, the LMA was canceled due to legal problems with Harbor Pointe Entertainment. WCXT returned to its AC format under a slightly different slogan/positioner, "105-3, Your More Music Station." Other than the new slogan, the format was much the same as before "The Whip" experiment, largely voicetracked and automated, with few commercials.

In 2001, a construction permit for a new station on 105.3 was granted in Wisconsin. It would be licensed to Mukwonago, Wisconsin, and serve the Milwaukee metropolitan area. Because WCXT could regularly be heard across Lake Michigan in the Milwaukee and Sheboygan areas, Salem Communications (which owned the Wisconsin station at 105.3) paid the owners of WCXT to downgrade its signal from 100 kW to 28,000 watts, so its signal would not interfere with the Milwaukee-area station.

In late 2004, WCXT was granted a construction permit to move into the Grand Rapids-Muskegon area. The new city of license became Coopersville and the station's class changed from C to B.

In early 2005, it was announced that WCXT would be sold to Citadel Broadcasting, a forerunner of today's Cumulus Media. With the sale came speculation about what would air once the station was newly built near Grand Rapids. In winter 2005, the format flipped to an automated and commercial-free classic country sound. The new owners called the station "Classic Country 105.3" with Citadel's takeover. This would turn out to be a filler format until the transmitter move would be completed.

In late April 2006, the new transmitter hit the airwaves. The station began stunting with various sound effects such as drills and hammers. Announcements were made that a new station is being built and that classic country had been moved to 92.5 FM (WKOQ, later changing to WLAW). A few days later, the station began calling itself "Reality Radio," featuring various Citadel hosts talking about the upcoming format.

On May 2, 2006 at 7:40 pm, 105.3 relaunched as Top 40 (CHR) "Hot FM." The first song played was "Bad Day" by Daniel Powter. Until the midday hours of May 3, the station ran a 20–30 song loop with an extended period of dead air between the songs. This was likely due to automation problem. The station picked up the WHTS call letters after 98.9 in Rock Island, Illinois, dropped it earlier that same year. The old WHTS also was a top 40 station.

Citadel merged with Cumulus Media on September 16, 2011.
