= N-acetylglucosaminyl-diphospho-decaprenol L-rhamnosyltransferase =

Class of enzymes

Identifiers
- EC no.: 2.4.1.289

Databases
- IntEnz: IntEnz view
- BRENDA: BRENDA entry
- ExPASy: NiceZyme view
- KEGG: KEGG entry
- MetaCyc: metabolic pathway
- PRIAM: profile
- PDB structures: RCSB PDB PDBe PDBsum
Search
- PMC: articles
- PubMed: articles
- NCBI: proteins

N-acetylglucosaminyl-diphospho-decaprenol L-rhamnosyltransferase (EC 2.4.1.289, WbbL) is an enzyme with systematic name dTDP-6-deoxy-beta-L-mannose:N-acetyl-alpha-D-glucosaminyl-diphospho-trans,octacis-decaprenol 3-alpha-L-rhamnosyltransferase. This enzyme catalyses the following chemical reaction

dTDP-6-deoxy-beta-L-mannose + N-acetyl-alpha-D-glucosaminyl-diphospho-trans,octacis-decaprenol $\rightleftharpoons$ dTDP + alpha-L-rhamnopyranosyl-(1->3)-N-acetyl-alpha-D-glucosaminyl-diphospho-trans,octacis-decaprenol

This enzyme requires Mn^{2+} or Mg^{2+}.
