= WLAV-FM =

Coordinates: 42.959639°N 85.895806°W

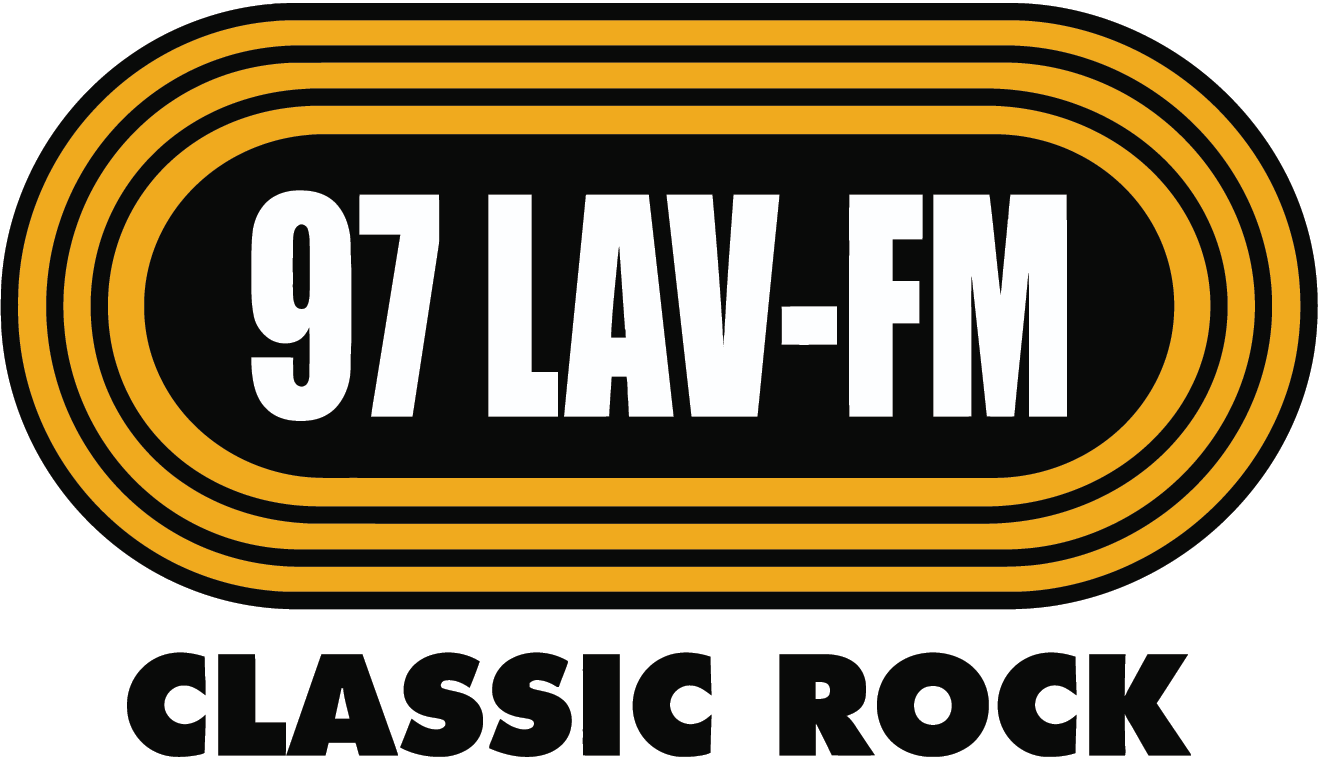

Grand Rapids, Michigan; United States
- Broadcast area: Grand Rapids metropolitan area
- Frequency: 96.9 MHz (HD Radio)
- Branding: 97 LAV-FM

Programming
- Format: Classic rock
- Affiliations: Westwood One

Ownership
- Owner: Cumulus Media; (Radio License Holding CBC, LLC)
- Sister stations: WHTS; WJRW; WKLQ; WTNR

History
- First air date: January 1947
- Call sign meaning: Leonard Adrian Versluis (original owner)

Technical information
- Licensing authority: FCC
- Facility ID: 41680
- Class: B
- ERP: 43,000 watts
- HAAT: 160 meters (520 ft)

Links
- Public license information: Public file; LMS
- Webcast: Listen live
- Website: www.wlav.com

WLAV-FM (96.9 MHz) is a commercial radio station in Grand Rapids, Michigan. It is owned by Cumulus Media and it broadcasts a classic rock format. The studios and offices are in the Symplicity Communications Building at 60 Monroe Center Street NW in Grand Rapids.

WLAV has an effective radiated power (ERP) of 43,000 watts. The transmitter is off Pierce Street in Allendale.

== History ==
=== Early years ===
WLAV-FM signed on the air in January 1947. It was the FM sister station of WLAV 1340 AM (now WJRW). They were owned by Leonard Adrian Versluis, hence the call signs. The two stations would simulcast most of their programming through the 1960s. Both stations were network affiliates of ABC Radio.

By the early 1970s, WLAV-FM began airing separate programming. In the daytime, it used the automated "Love" format, a mix of instrumentals and soft vocals. At night, it played progressive rock music. Also for a time in the early 1970s, WLAV-FM played oldies under the tag line "Grand Rapids' Goldmine". The rock music proved to be popular and it was expanded to all day. In 1974, WLAV-FM became western Michigan's first full-time album rock station and was a quick success among FM stations in the market.

The station experienced difficulties in the 1980s. It was sued for the death of two people and the injury of two other at its popular annual raft race event. Many of its top disc jockeys began to leave: morning host Laurie DeYoung moved to Baltimore, Tony Gates left in 1984, and in 1986 popular morning personality Kevin Matthews relocated to St. Louis.

=== Modern rock ===
By the early 1990s, WLAV-FM was doing poorly in the ratings, facing increased competition from album rock outlet WKLQ and classic rocker WJFM. WLAV had been a top five station just a year before and had been the #1 station 12+ as recently as fall 1987. But in the spring 1991 Arbitron ratings report, WLAV fell out of the top ten stations 12+. Its role as Grand Rapids' top album rock station was usurped by WKLQ.

On Memorial Day 1992, the station changed to a modern rock format. Management felt that alternative rock was the direction that most rock radio was heading towards to stay contemporary with the tastes of young fans. But it lasted only a little more than a year on WLAV-FM. Following backlash from listeners, by the fall of 1993, the alternative format relocated to its sister station, AM 1340 WLAV, calling it "1340 Underground". The modern rock sound ran for approximately two years on 1340 AM until a sports radio format replaced it. WLAV-FM returned to a more classic rock-driven playlist. The station continued refining the format during the 1990s, honing it towards classic rock music released between the 1960s and 1980s. Slowly WLAV-FM recovered in the ratings.

=== Change in ownership ===
Citadel Broadcasting acquired the station from Bloomington Broadcasting (doing business as Michigan Media) in 2000. Citadel merged with Cumulus Media on September 16, 2011.

In the evening, the station carries the syndicated Steve Gorman Rocks, hosted by the drummer for The Black Crows. The show is based in Nashville.
