= Gerber Products Company =

Purveyor of baby food and baby products

- Type: Subsidiary
- Industry: Baby foods
- Founded: 1927; 99 years ago in Fremont, Michigan, U.S.
- Founder: Daniel Frank Gerber
- Headquarters: Fremont, Michigan, U.S.
- Area served: Worldwide
- Parent: Nestlé
- Website: gerber.com

Gerber Products Company is an American purveyor of baby food and baby products headquartered in Fremont, Michigan. Gerber Products Company is a subsidiary of Nestlé.

Other Gerber products include breastfeeding pumps and other supplies, baby bottles and nipples, and health care products including tooth and gum cleanser and vitamin drops.

== History ==
=== Beginning and consolidation ===
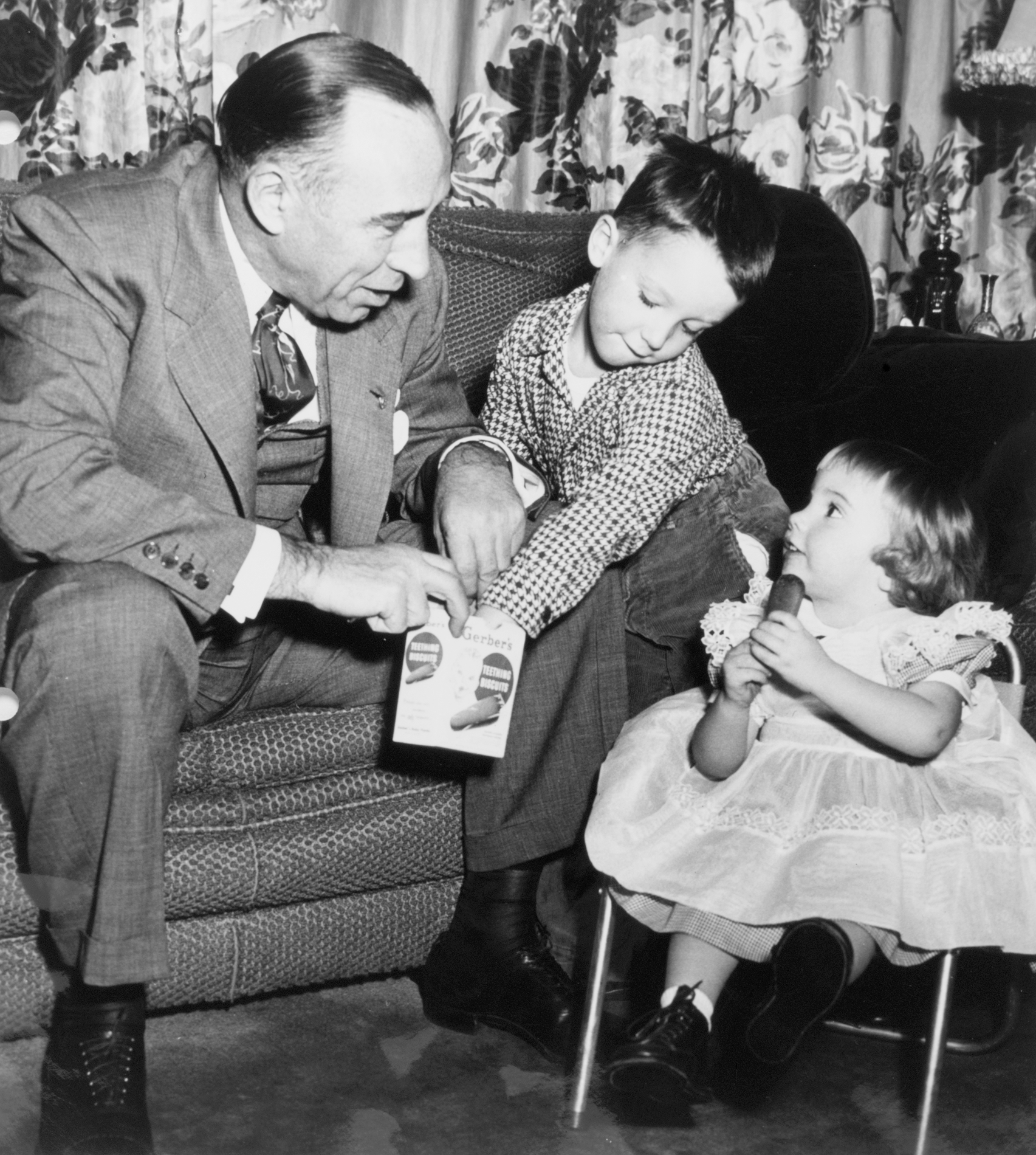
Daniel Gerber, founder

Gerber was founded in 1927 in Fremont, Michigan, by Daniel Frank Gerber, owner of the Fremont Canning Company, which produced canned fruit and vegetables. At the suggestion of a pediatrician, Gerber's wife, Dorothy, began making hand-strained food for their seven-month-old daughter, Sally. Recognising a business opportunity, Gerber began making baby food. By 1928 he had developed five products for the market: beef vegetable soup and strained peas, prunes, carrots, and spinach. Six months later, Gerber's baby foods were distributed nationwide.

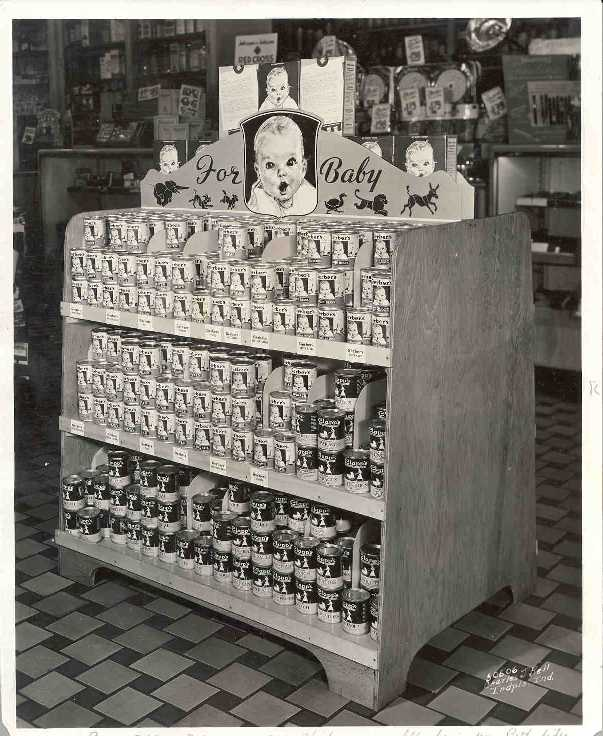
Gerber retail display in 1940

Some believe that Dorothy Gerber was the initial inspiration behind their baby food products. One day after a visit to her infant daughter's pediatrician she toiled in the kitchen straining fruits and vegetables for her child. After much hard work she suggested to her husband Daniel, whose family already owned the Fremont Canning Company, to create this food in an industrial setting, lightening the load of mothers everywhere. A different interpretation of the story is that he was frustrated and upset having come home to find his wife looking strained and miserable in the kitchen. Not wanting to "exchange" his beautiful wife for this kitchen-bound monstrosity, he then invented the Gerber baby food product line.

The brand eventually became a major company in the baby food industry, currently offering more than 190 products in 80 countries, with labeling in 16 languages. Its primary competitors are Beech-Nut and Del Monte Foods. As of 2017, Gerber controls 61 percent of the baby food market in the United States.

=== Product diversification ===
In 1960, Gerber started selling its baby food in glass jars. Soon after, other items such as pacifiers, baby bottles, and small baby toys were introduced.

In 1967, executives at Gerber Products decided to offer a line of life insurance products aimed at young families. The company's term and whole life insurance products for adults and children are available in the United States, Puerto Rico, and most of Canada.

Early in the 1990s, Gerber tried to enter into the sugar-free food market with a Sugar Free Vanilla Custard flavor, marketed to parents with diabetic babies. The product did not see as much demand as expected, so it was dropped after a few years. Gerber also began to produce juices around the same time.

In 1999 Gerber established skincare products for babies.

In 2001 Gerber partially replaced the glass jars with plastic tubs for vegetables and some fruits. Further development toward plastic packaging continued in 2003 after the 2001 change was considered a financial success. Other fruits and meats are still sold in jars.

On December 31, 2018, Gerber Life Insurance was sold to Western & Southern Financial Group, who continue to use the Gerber trademark under license.

=== Merger ===
In 1994, Gerber merged with Sandoz Laboratories. Two years later, Sandoz merged with CIBA-Geigy to form Novartis, one of the largest pharmaceutical companies in the world. In 2007, Gerber was sold to Nestlé for $5.5 billion.

== Consumer relations ==
Gerber has a long history of projecting a family-friendly image. When Gerber Products established a consumer relations department in 1938, then ten-year-old Sally Gerber began answering each customer's letter individually, a practice she would continue for many years, even after she became a senior vice president of the company. In 1986 the company set up the Gerber Parents' Resource Center, a toll-free customer relations hotline, which has been providing information on baby food and parenting issues ever since.

== Gerber Baby ==
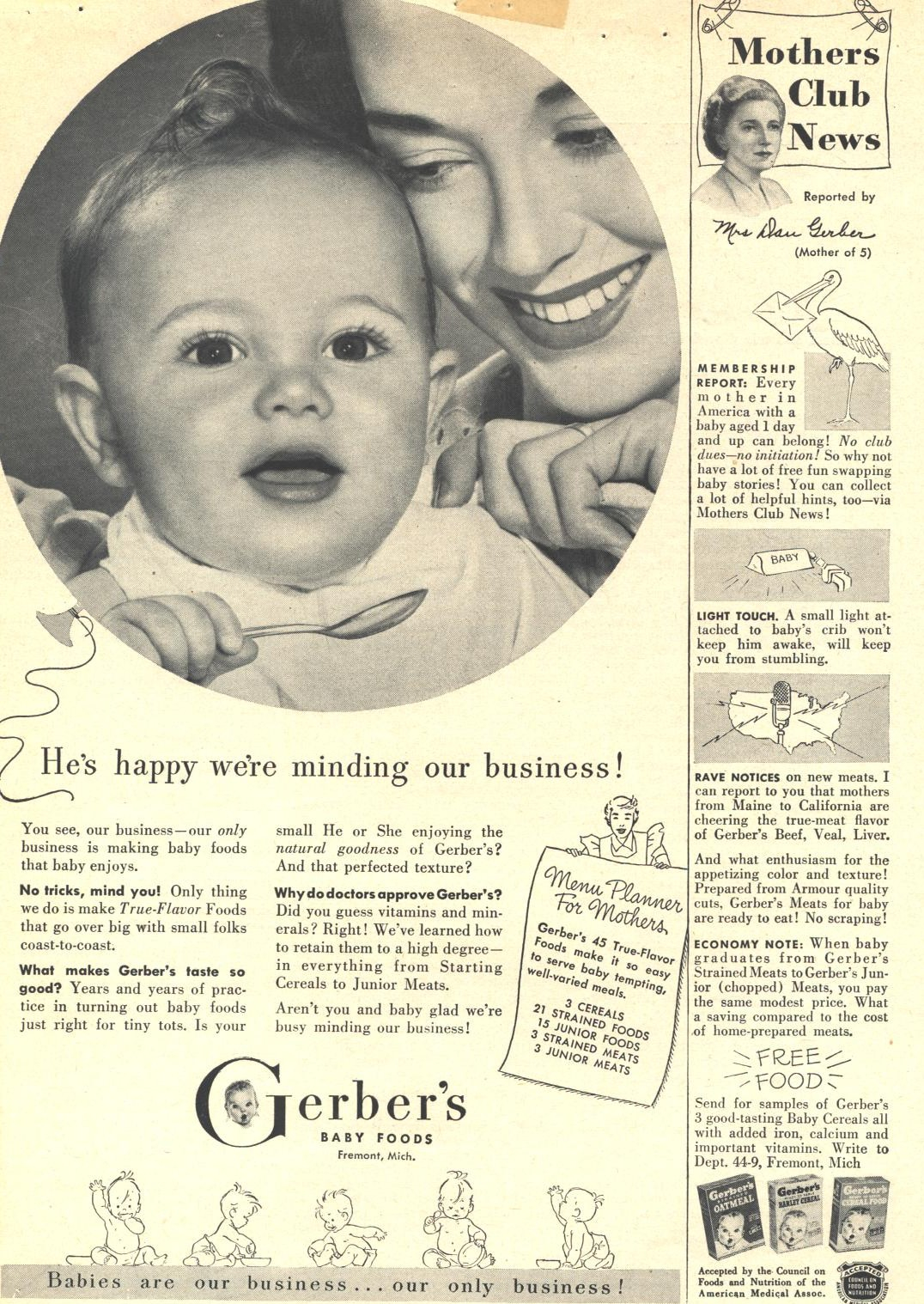
The Gerber Baby featured in a 1949 ad

According to Gerber, Ann Turner Cook is the famous Gerber Baby whose portrait is featured prominently on all Gerber product packaging. She was depicted in a charcoal sketch by her neighbor, Dorothy Hope Smith. Smith entered the sketch for the company's logo contest.

== Tax break and expansion ==
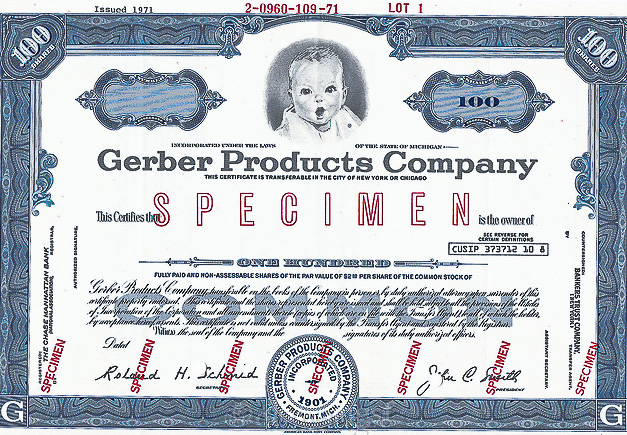
Gerber Products Company Specimen Stock Certificate c. 1971

In September 2008, Gerber's Fremont facilities were designated as a Michigan Agricultural Renaissance Zone, receiving $43 million in tax breaks over 15 years. In order to receive the incentives, Gerber agreed to continue its employment in Fremont at 1,100 jobs and invest $50 million in its Fremont facilities over the course of the next ten years. However, to get the full 15 years of tax breaks, Gerber agreed to increase employment by 200 and spend a total of $75 million on its facilities. The tax breaks have been largely supported, despite large revenue losses by local governments: $300,000 in losses per year for the City of Fremont (10% of their budget) and $160,000 a year for Newaygo County. It is estimated local governments would give up potentially $15 million in revenue over the 15 years as part of the tax break. Both the county and the city will be working with the Fremont Area Community Foundation to receive funds in the initial years to help with specific projects and programs. The Fremont Public School District would receive assistance through the state school aid formula. Nestlé Nutrition North America CEO Kurt Schmidt said that the Fremont research and development center will be one of 23 worldwide Nestlé "product technology centers" and also include scientific research for baby and infant nutritional products. It is expected that the new investment will help make Newaygo County a "global leader in scientific research".

== Gerber products ==
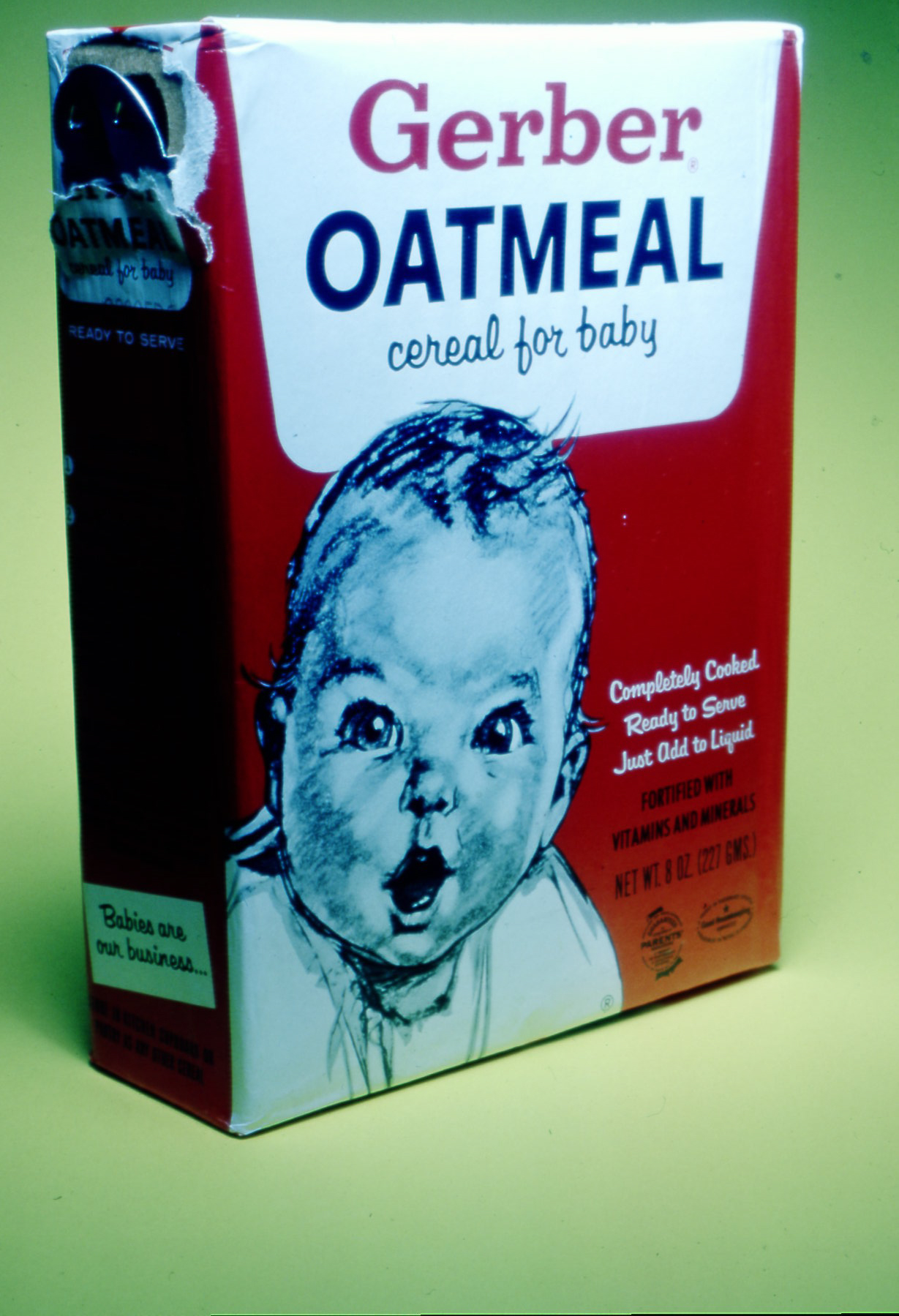
Oatmeal

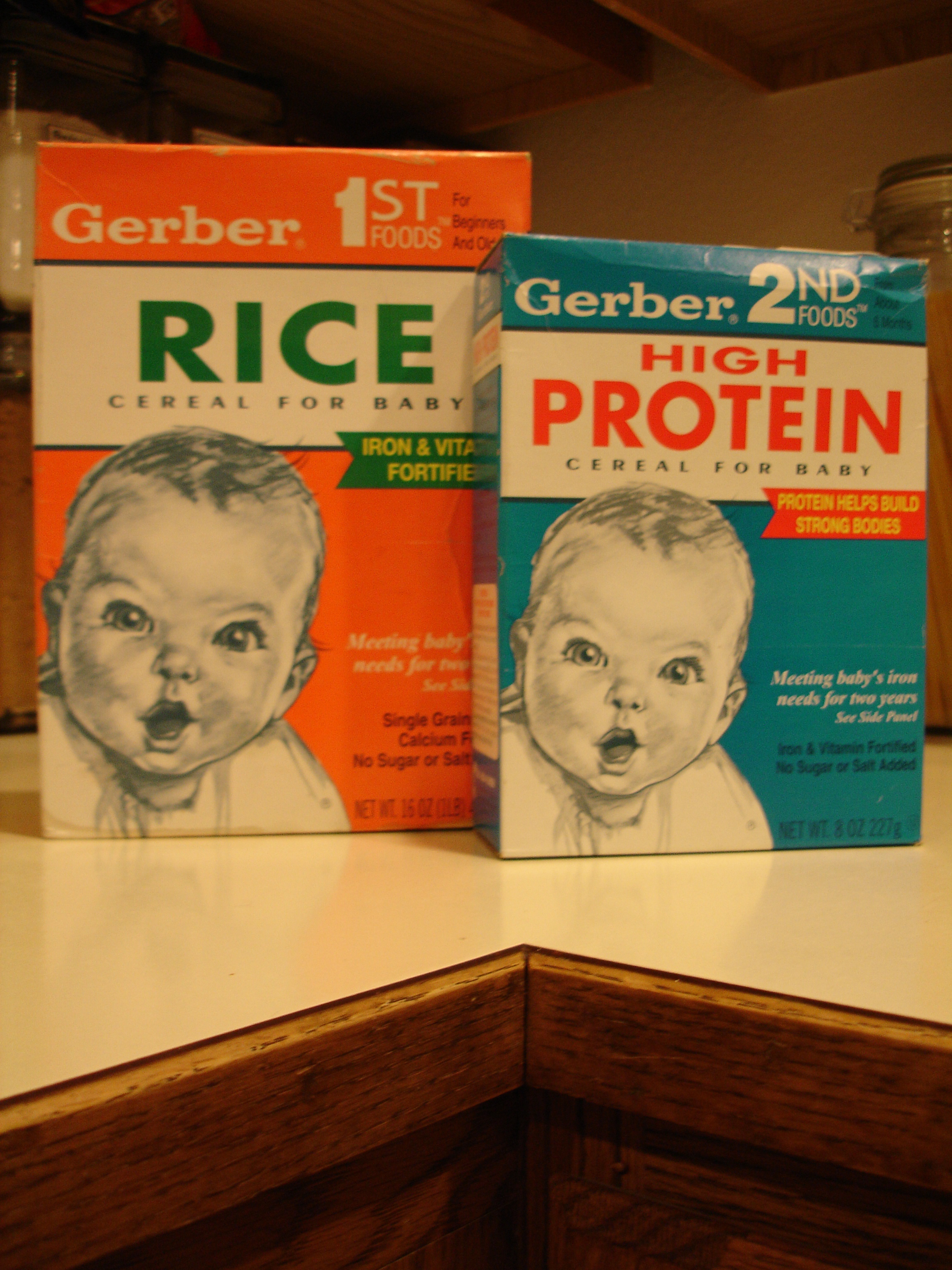
Boxed food

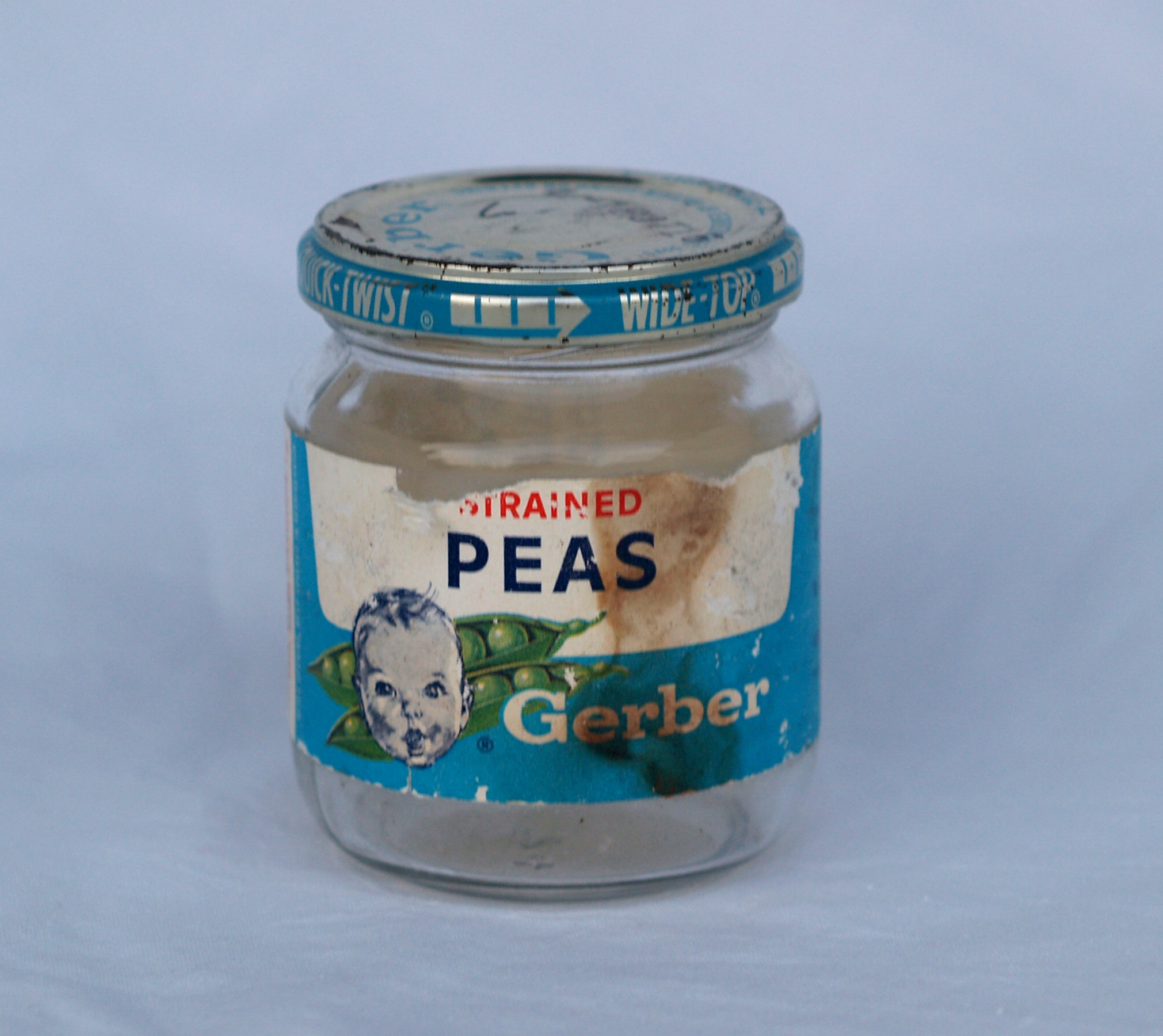
Strained peas

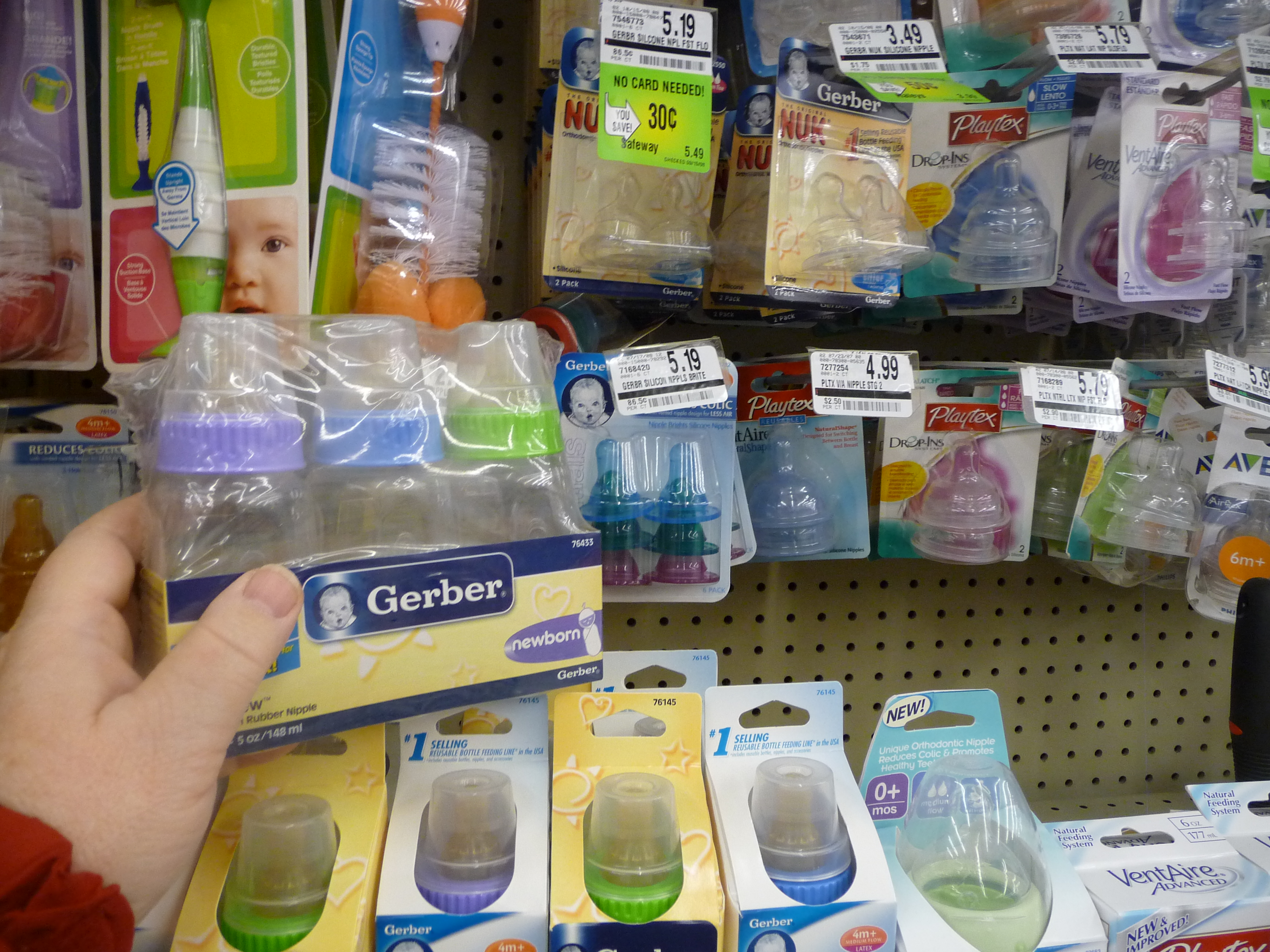
Baby bottles

== See also ==
- Gerber Singles
