= WJRW =

Sports radio station in Grand Rapids, Michigan

- Grand Rapids, Michigan; United States
- Frequency: 1340 kHz
- Branding: The Ticket

Programming
- Format: Sports
- Affiliations: BetMGM Network; Westwood One Sports; Fox Sports Radio

Ownership
- Owner: Cumulus Media; (Radio License Holding CBC, LLC)
- Sister stations: WHTS; WKLQ; WLAV-FM; WTNR

History
- First air date: September 16, 1940 (as WLAV)
- Former call signs: WLAV (1940–1979); WTWN (1980–1984); WLAV (1984–1994); WBBL (1994–2009)
- Call sign meaning: WJR in Western Michigan

Technical information
- Licensing authority: FCC
- Facility ID: 41679
- Class: C
- Power: 1,000 watts unlimited
- Transmitter coordinates: 42°57′5.1″N 85°41′55.1″W
- Translator: 106.1 W291DJ (Grand Rapids)

Links
- Public license information: Public file; LMS
- Webcast: Listen live
- Website: theticketmi.com

WJRW (1340 AM) – branded as The Ticket – is a commercial sports radio station licensed to Grand Rapids, Michigan, serving the Grand Rapids metropolitan area. Owned by Cumulus Media, WJRW is the Grand Rapids affiliate for the BetMGM Network, Westwood One Sports, and Fox Sports Radio. The WJRW studios and transmitter both reside in Grand Rapids. In addition to a standard analog transmission, the station also simulcasts over low-power FM translator W291DJ (106.1 FM) and is available online.

== History ==
On September 16, 1940, the station signed on under the WLAV call sign (which stood for Leonard Adrian Versluis, the station's original owner). It was Grand Rapids' second radio station. Versluis added WLAV-FM in 1947 and WLAV-TV, West Michigan's first television station, in 1949. He sold the television station to the owners of Grand Rapids' first radio station, WOOD; it is now WOOD-TV.

WLAV became a full-time Top 40 music station in the summer of 1963, and was originally consulted by Mike Joseph, who later on went to develop the Hot Hits format in the late 1970s. One popular WLAV personality was Larry Adderley, who later worked as a sportscaster at various radio and TV stations in the Detroit media market as well as an announcer for the Detroit Tigers.

WLAV soon overtook rival stations WGRD and WMAX as the dominant hit music station in Grand Rapids, but its market share declined in the 1970s with the popularity of FM stations such as WZZM-FM, WGRD-FM, and WLAV's own sister station WLAV-FM, which found success as an album rock station. "Music Radio WLAV" went to a more adult contemporary sound in 1974, which continued until 1980, when the station tried a talk radio format as the "1340 Townhouse", featuring popular talk show hosts Lee Harris and Bob Kwesell. Along with the new format came new call letters, WTWN.

The heritage WLAV call letters were restored in 1984, and the station flipped to oldies, which lasted for the next eight years. Although WLAV was a modest success with oldies, it was hurt when WODJ debuted in 1989 as an FM oldies station with a stronger signal and swept the ratings.

In 1993, the format changed to a modern rock-based sound called "1340 Underground". This happened shortly after an experiment with changing the format to modern rock on WLAV-FM had failed. WLAV-FM then reverted to classic rock. The "1340 Underground" format gained a considerable cult following in the Grand Rapids area, even though its night-time signal was poor.

A sports radio format under the WBBL call sign debuted on May 25, 1994, when ownership of the radio station had changed. On May 28, 2009, WBBL began simulcasting its sports programming on 107.3 FM in Greenville, which became WBBL-FM.

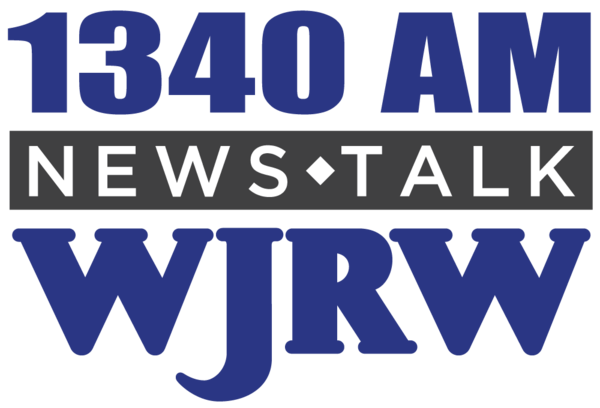
Logo as a talk station

On August 18, 2009, the station flipped to talk radio as WJRW; the call letters are a nod to its Detroit sister station WJR. The new lineup would feature local personalities such as former WLAV-FM host Tony Gates and WZZM anchor Lee VanAmeyde, along with regionally- and nationally-syndicated personalities such as Michael Patrick Shiels, WJR's Frank Beckmann, and Mark Levin. On March 31, 2011, it was announced that local radio veteran Michelle McKormick would be joining WJRW as host of The Buzz with Michelle McKormick. Her show debuted on June 6, 2011.

On January 4, 2019, the station switched to sports radio following the flip of co-owned WBBL-FM from sports to country music. WJRW now carries a couple of shows previously heard on WBBL-FM, as well as programming from CBS Sports Radio.

== FM translator ==
Broadcast translator for WJRW
Call sign	Frequency	City of license	FID	ERP (W)	HAAT	Class	Transmitter coordinates	FCC info
W291DJ	106.1 FM	Grand Rapids, Michigan	200865	75	79 m (259 ft)	D	42°57′6″N 85°41′56″W	LMS
