= WTNR (FM) =

- Greenville, Michigan; United States
- Broadcast area: Grand Rapids, Michigan
- Frequency: 107.3 MHz
- Branding: Thunder 107.3

Programming
- Format: Country
- Affiliations: Compass Media Networks; Westwood One

Ownership
- Owner: Cumulus Media; (Radio License Holding CBC, LLC)
- Sister stations: WKLQ; WHTS; WJRW; WLAV-FM; WWSN

History
- First air date: 1962 (as WPLB-FM)
- Former call signs: WPLB-FM (1962–1989); WODJ (1989–2004); WKLQ (2004–2009); WBBL-FM (2009–2019)
- Call sign meaning: "Thunder"

Technical information
- Licensing authority: FCC
- Facility ID: 24639
- Class: B
- ERP: 50,000 watts
- HAAT: 150 meters (490 ft)
- Transmitter coordinates: 43.019°N 85.349°W

Links
- Public license information: Public file; LMS
- Webcast: Listen live
- Website: www.thunder1073.com

WTNR (107.3 MHz, "Thunder 107.3") is an FM radio station licensed to Greenville, Michigan. Owned by Cumulus Media, the station broadcasts a country music format targeting Grand Rapids.

== History ==
The station was first assigned the call sign WPLB-FM in 1962 and was originally licensed to Greenville, Michigan. It was sister station to WPLB (1060 AM; later 1380 AM). The station became oldies-formatted on November 15, 1989, and the call sign was changed to WODJ. The WPLB-FM call sign was subsequently moved to 106.3 FM in Lakeview, Michigan (the AM and FM are now known as WGLM).

=== WODJ ===
WPLB-FM became WODJ, an oldies station targeting the Grand Rapids market, in 1989, and was an immediate success, reaching number one in the 12+ Arbitron ratings for Grand Rapids the following year. The station's success was built on its visibility at community events, such as the Grand Center Boat Show, which took place at the Grand Center in downtown Grand Rapids. By 2000, however, the station was struggling to make the top ten in 12+ ratings. Oldies 107.3 also featured the syndicated Dick Clark's Rock, Roll & Remember, which aired on Sunday afternoons.

=== WKLQ ===
On October 11, 2004, WODJ and the oldies format was replaced by active rock station WKLQ, which had been replaced by country music station WTNR after 20 years on 94.5 FM. The WODJ calls were most recently used by Citadel Broadcasting on talk-radio station 1490 AM in Whitehall, Michigan, which was also replaced by the WKLQ call sign in 2009. The call sign is now held by Mentor Partners of Big Rapids, Michigan, on a construction permit for a new AM station for 1590 kHz.

Shortly before KLQ's move to 107.3, they hired Justice and Jim for mornings. In summer 2005, the duo created controversy when they announced on the air that they were going to drown a dog. The announcement persuaded several listeners to call 911. A day later, they announced that it was only a stunt.

On July 19, 2006, Justice and Jim were fired and replaced by The Opie and Anthony Show.

WKLQ launched Grey & Kluck mornings featuring Grand Rapids market veteran Michael Grey and Warren Kluck on July 17, 2008. Kluck spent three years previously doing morning drive at WRKR-FM in Kalamazoo, MI.

Repeater station WKOQ (92.5 FM) signed on the air on August 15, 2005; the WODJ call sign that was abandoned by WKLQ in 2004 had been parked on this frequency prior to going on the air. It transmitted from the same tower as television station WZZM in Newaygo County, near Grant. The simulcast was terminated on May 1, 2006, when the station became WLAW-FM, "The Outlaw," airing a blend of country music and Southern Rock.

=== WBBL-FM ===
On May 28, 2009, WKLQ was replaced with sister station WBBL-FM, which was previously on the AM dial (now WJRW), and WKLQ was made an exclusive web-station. The Grey and Kluck Morning show was pulled off the air. Warren Kluck went to do the Kevin Matthews Morning Show. Michael Grey went on to The Starting Line Up with Bret Bakita on the new WBBL-FM.

Michael Grey left WBBL-FM in May 2011. Ray Bentley, former inside linebacker for the Buffalo Bills has stepped in and the show has been rebranded as "Bakita & Bentley." Citadel merged with Cumulus Media on September 16, 2011.

After having a "revolving door" of morning drive hosts, Eric Zane (formerly of "The Free Beer and Hotwings Show") started his own show on April 20, 2016, as a 4-hour general talk show with showtime between 6 A.M. and 10 A.M. Though starting as a 4-hour program, in June 2017, the show dropped its 4th hour in favor of "The Sudden Death Podcast". The show was co-hosted by long-time WBBL-FM Morning producer Julius (or "OJ") until September 29, 2017. Current Producer Ben will fill in as Co-Host.

On January 4, 2019, it was reported that WBBL-FM's program director and entire airstaff had been laid off. Later that evening, the station began simulcasting WTNR's country format, with both stations re-branded as Thunder 94.5 & 107.3. An agreement was made for Bill Simonson's The Huge Show to move to WJRW and WKLQ, which also re-launched as The Ticket. The simulcast was used to transition WTNR's country format to 107.3; WTNR flipped to an adult album alternative format (later reinstating the WKLQ calls) on January 19, 2019.

=== WTNR ===
The station changed its call sign to the current WTNR on February 13, 2019.

On October 1, 2025, the format was updated to include classic country songs from the 1980s and 1990s, as well as more recent releases. A new slogan, "All Time Country Favorites", began to be used.
