= WWSN (FM) =

Radio station in Newaygo, Michigan

Coordinates: 43.310°N 85.913°W

- Newaygo, Michigan; United States
- Broadcast area: Muskegon, Michigan
- Frequency: 92.5 MHz
- Branding: Sunny 92.5

Programming
- Format: Adult contemporary
- Affiliations: Westwood One

Ownership
- Owner: Cumulus Media; (Radio License Holding CBC, LLC)
- Sister stations: WHTS; WLCS; WVIB

History
- First air date: July 29, 2005 (as WKOQ)
- Former call signs: WODJ (2004–2005); WODJ-FM (2005); WKOQ (2005–2006); WLAW (2006–2019)
- Call sign meaning: "Sunny"

Technical information
- Licensing authority: FCC
- Facility ID: 89477
- Class: A
- ERP: 2,250 watts
- HAAT: 165 meters

Links
- Public license information: Public file; LMS
- Webcast: Listen live
- Website: www.sunnymuskegon.com

WWSN (92.5 MHz), known as "Sunny 92.5", is an FM radio station located in Newaygo, Michigan, owned by Cumulus Media. From 2006 to 2019, the format was country music as WLAW.

Before playing its previous country format, the frequency was used to simulcast sister stations WKLQ and WLAV.

The station's transmitter is located on the same tower as sister station WHTS. The tower is owned by WZZM-TV.

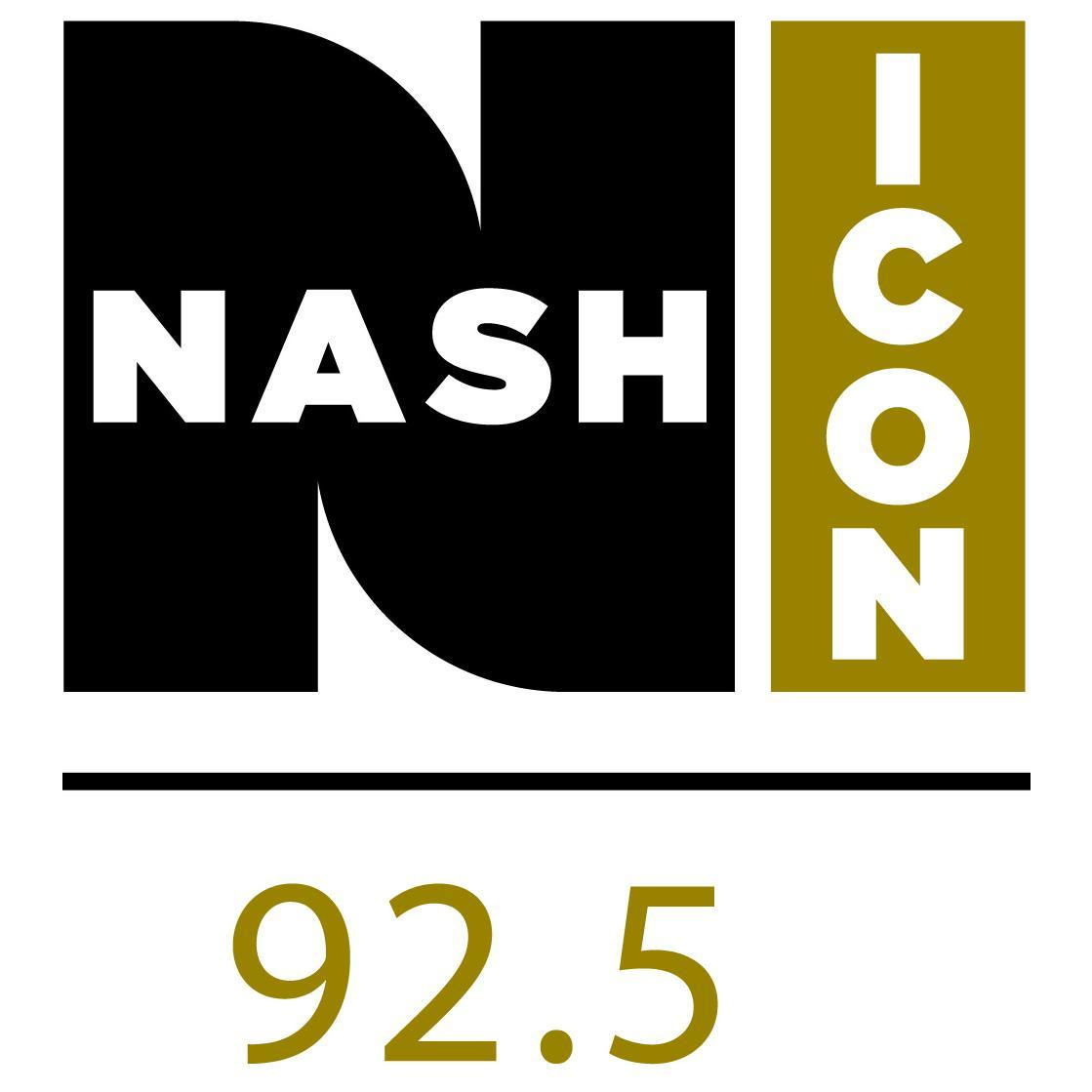
Logo as "92.5 Nash Icon"

On August 15, 2014, WLAW became one of the first stations to join the "Nash Icon" network as 92.5 Nash Icon. With the change, 92.5 kept part of the classic country artists, but added more music from newer country artists.

On April 1, 2019, the WLAW call sign and its "Nash Icon" country format moved to 97.5 FM Whitehall, swapping frequencies with adult contemporary-formatted WWSN, which moved to 92.5 FM Newaygo.
