= WLAW-FM =

Radio station in Whitehall, Michigan

Coordinates: 43.384°N 86.325°W

- Whitehall, Michigan; United States
- Broadcast area: Muskegon, Michigan
- Frequency: 97.5 MHz
- Branding: 97.5 Nash Icon

Programming
- Format: Country

Ownership
- Owner: Cumulus Media; (Radio License Holding CBC, LLC)
- Sister stations: WLAW; WLCS; WVIB; WWSN

History
- First air date: April 1, 1991
- Last air date: March 14, 2025
- Former call signs: WPBK-FM (1991–1992); WEFG-FM (1992–2010); WWSN (2010–2019); WLAW (2019–2021)

Technical information
- Licensing authority: FCC
- Facility ID: 53960
- Class: A
- ERP: 3,000 watts
- HAAT: 134.2 meters (440 ft)
- Repeater: 1490 WLAW (Whitehall)

Links
- Public license information: Public file; LMS

WLAW-FM (97.5 MHz, "97.5 Nash Icon") was a radio station broadcasting a country music format. Licensed to Whitehall, Michigan, the station served the Muskegon, Michigan market. The station's programming was derived from Cumulus Media Networks' Hits & Favorites format until Westwood One took over. It was heard as far as Grand Rapids, Michigan, east of U.S. Route 131, and it experienced interference from WJIM-FM from Lansing. It was last affiliated with Nash Icon, one of Westwood One's country networks. It was also heard on W256DM 99.1 in Muskegon.

== History ==
The station began broadcasting on April 1, 1991, as WPBK-FM with a satellite-fed country format from Unistar Radio Networks, and became WEFG-FM ("Frog") soon afterward. In 1995, WEFG-FM's format changed to a 1970s-based classic hits format (as Eagle 97.5) satellite-fed from Westwood One. In 1999, Westwood One discontinued its 1970s hits format in favor of rhythmic oldies (tagged as "Groovin' Oldies"), and WEFG-FM continued with this format until switching back to country (as "Kickin' Country") in 2002 and then to sports in 2005.

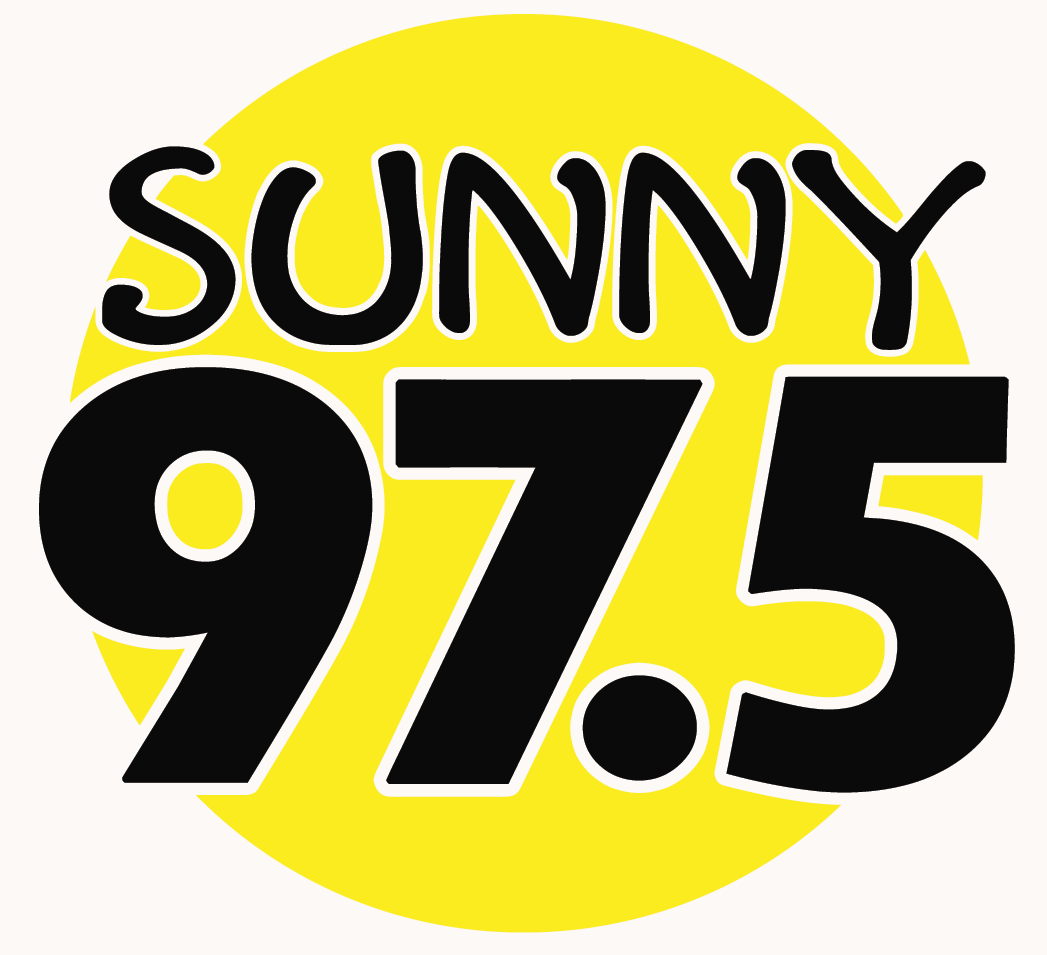
Logo as WWSN

On December 14, 2010, just four days after it was announced that Clear Channel/Muskegon would replace WSHZ's adult contemporary format with WMUS and its country format, WEFG-FM dropped its sports format as "The Champ" to pick up WSHZ's former one as "Sunny FM" WWSN. This marked the second time since 1996 that another station had used the "Sunny" moniker other than WSNX, whose call letters once matched that handle. Sister station WVIB was known as Sunny FM for a time until 2004.

On April 1, 2019, the WWSN call sign and its "Sunny" adult contemporary format moved to 92.5 FM, swapping frequencies with country-formatted WLAW, which moved to 97.5 FM. On August 24, 2021, the station changed its call sign to WLAW-FM.

WLAW-FM and simulcast partner WLAW went silent in March 2025. They were of 11 Cumulus Media stations to close the weekend of March 14, as part of a larger shutdown of underperforming Cumulus stations. The WLAW stations' tower leases were rejected as part of Cumulus's chapter 11 bankruptcy in March 2026; on March 12, Cumulus requested the cancellation of the WLAW-FM license.
