= WKLQ (FM) =

Coordinates: 42.856°N 85.963°W

- Holland, Michigan; United States
- Broadcast area: Grand Rapids, Michigan
- Frequency: 94.5 MHz
- Branding: The Q 94.5

Programming
- Format: Adult album alternative

Ownership
- Owner: Cumulus Media; (Radio License Holding CBC, LLC)
- Sister stations: WTNR; WHTS; WJRW; WLAV-FM

History
- First air date: 1961 (as WJBL-FM)
- Former call signs: WFMK (1960); WJBL-FM (1960–1984); WKLQ (1984–2004); WTNR (2004–2019)

Technical information
- Licensing authority: FCC
- Facility ID: 41678
- Class: B
- ERP: 50,000 watts
- HAAT: 152 meters (499 ft)

Links
- Public license information: Public file; LMS
- Webcast: Listen live
- Website: thisisqmusic.com

WKLQ (94.5 MHz, "The Q 94.5") is an FM radio station licensed to Holland, Michigan. Owned by Cumulus Media, the station broadcasts an adult album alternative format serving the Grand Rapids market.

== History ==
The WKLQ call sign was first associated with 94.5 FM, launching at 1:14 a.m. on March 1, 1984, with a Top 40/CHR format and went under the branding "KLQ". The station would eventually become the dominant CHR station throughout much of the 1980s, despite facing competition against WGRD. In 1990, KLQ dropped its CHR format and flipped to an active rock format, leaving WGRD the only CHR station remaining for a time. In 1996, the station added Howard Stern to the morning lineup. By 1999, the station had tweaked into alternative and became known as The Rock@94.5 KLQ. After a few years of struggling with the rock format, the station flipped to WTNR and country on October 11, 2004, as 94.5 The New Thunder Country, later branded as Thunder 94-5.

On October 27, 2011, WTNR completely revamped the station's playlist by adding gold tracks not previously played on the station. These included songs by artists from the 1990s and early 2000s like Garth Brooks, Shania Twain, Brooks & Dunn, Alan Jackson among others.

On February 3, 2014, the station rebranded under Cumulus Media's Nash FM brand.

On January 4, 2019, WTNR returned to the Thunder branding, and added a simulcast on 107.3 WBBL-FM to replace its sports talk format, with both stations branding as Thunder 94.5 & 107.3.

The simulcast would be short-lived; on January 19, 2019, WTNR dropped Thunder and flipped to adult album alternative as The Q 94.5. The WKLQ calls (warehoused by a co-owned AM talk radio operation in Whitehall, Michigan) were reinstated on February 6, 2019, to match the new branding.
