= WLCS =

Coordinates: 43.313917°N 86.154778°W

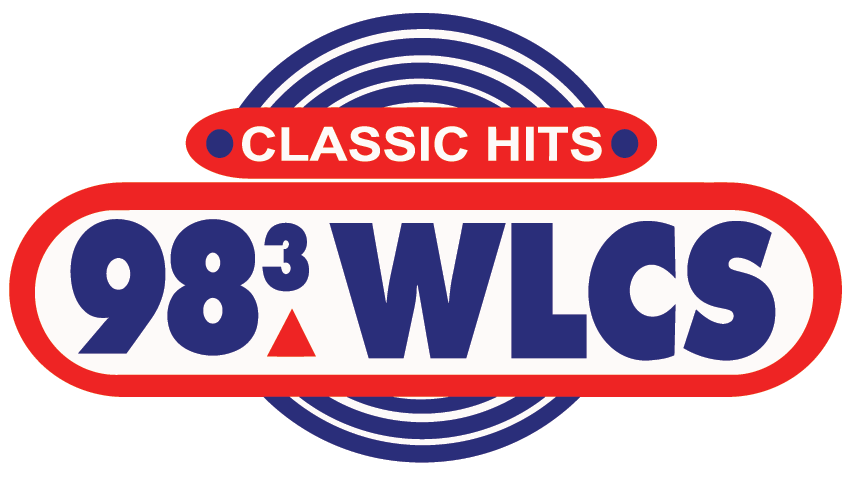
- North Muskegon, Michigan; United States
- Broadcast area: Muskegon, Michigan
- Frequency: 98.3 MHz
- Branding: Classic Hits 98.3 WLCS

Programming
- Format: Classic hits
- Affiliations: The Bob & Tom Show

Ownership
- Owner: Cumulus Media; (Radio License Holding CBC, LLC)
- Sister stations: WVIB; WWSN

History
- First air date: November 20, 1983
- Former call signs: WFMM (1983–1985); WAVX (1985–1988)
- Call sign meaning: WLC Broadcasting (former owner)

Technical information
- Licensing authority: FCC
- Facility ID: 5396
- Class: A
- ERP: 1,600 watts
- HAAT: 139 meters (456 ft)

Links
- Public license information: Public file; LMS
- Webcast: Listen live; Listen live; Listen live (via iHeartRadio)
- Website: www.983wlcs.com

WLCS (98.3 FM, "Classic Hits 98.3 WLCS") is a radio station broadcasting a classic hits format. Licensed to North Muskegon, Michigan, it first began broadcasting under the WFMM call sign. The station is owned by Cumulus Media.

Despite its relatively modest 1,600-watt ERP, WLCS provides at least secondary coverage as far north as New Era and as far south as Grand Haven and Allendale. It trades heavily on its Lakeshore-centric identity; for instance, it airs bumpers touting numerous cities in its coverage area.

The station is the Muskegon affiliate for Grand Valley State Lakers football and basketball. It also airs high school football in the fall and high school basketball during the winter.
