= McCamly Square =

Mixed-use in Battle Creek, Michigan, U.S.

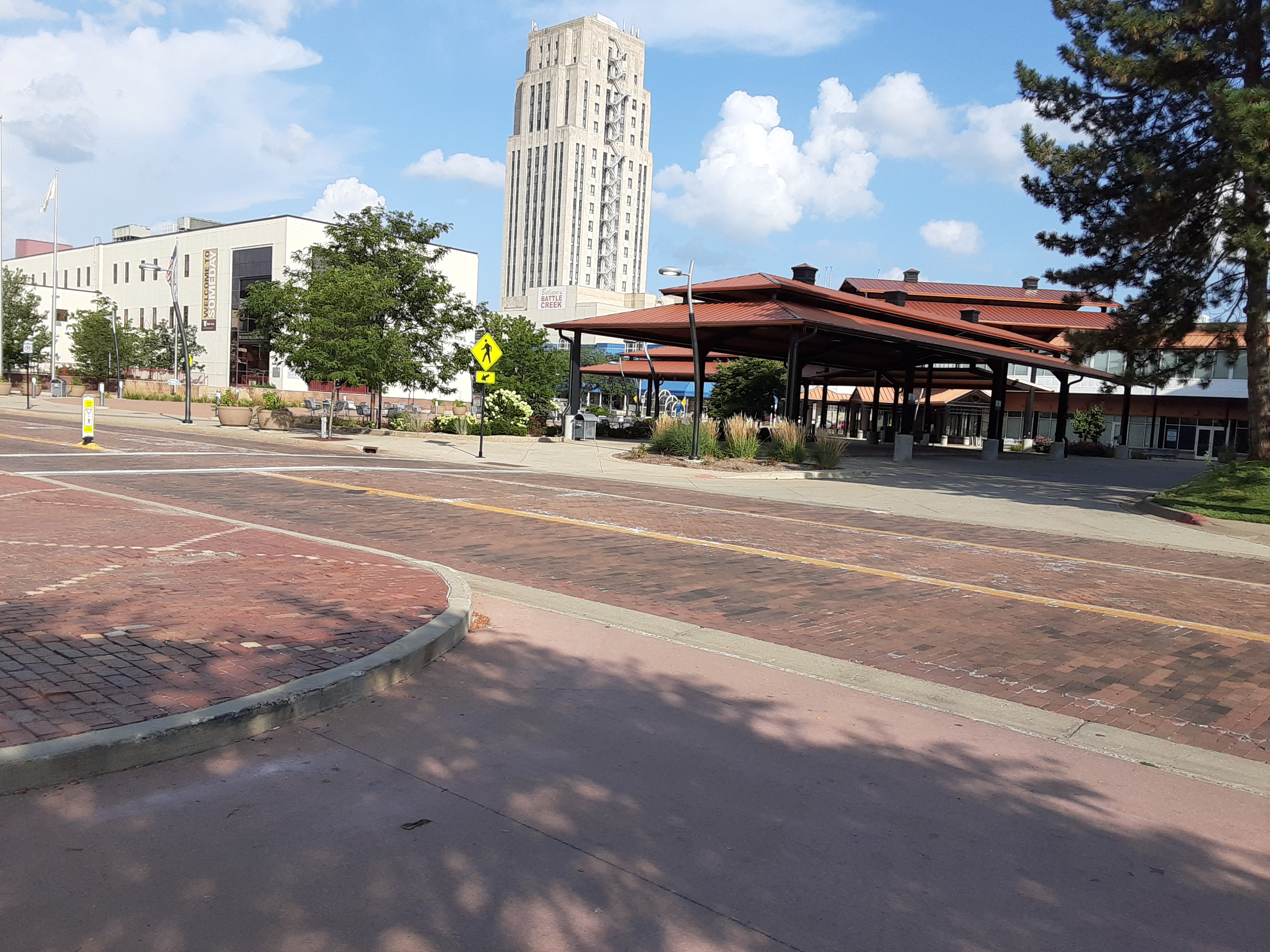
- Festival Market Square (August 2021)
- Former names: DoubleTree by Hilton Battle Creek: Stouffer Battle Creek Hotel (1981–1996); McCamly Plaza Hotel (1996–2019)

General information
- Type: Mixed-use
- Location: Battle Creek, Michigan, U.S., Hotel: 50 Capital Ave SW, 49017; Kellogg Arena: 1 McCamly Square, 49017; Outdoor space: 25 McCamly Street S, 49017; McCamly Place: 35 Jackson St NW, 49017
- Opening: November 23, 1981; 44 years ago (Stouffer Battle Creek Hotel and main public plaza); April 18, 1986; 40 years ago (McCamly Place); October 18, 2024; 2 years ago (as DoubleTree by Hilton Battle Creek)
- Renovated: Late 2017 – 2020 (failed); October 18, 2024 (hotel)
- Closed: November 2019; 6 years ago (McCamly Place and McCamly Plaza Hotel)
- Demolished: April 15, 2022 (McCamly Place only)
- Owner: Battle Creek Unlimited
- Operator: 6PM Hospitality Partners (hotel)

Technical details
- Floor count: 16 (at hotel); 2 (at McCamly Place)

Design and construction
- Developer: W.K. Kellogg Foundation (hotel and main public plaza); Enterprise Development Co. (McCamly Place)

Other information
- Number of stores: 29 at McCamly Place (at peak); 2 restaurants in the hotel (including The Beacon)
- Number of anchors: 1 restaurant (at peak)
- Number of suites: 248

McCamly Square is a mixed-use development in Battle Creek, Michigan, which originally consisted of a festival marketplace known as McCamly Place, and the DoubleTree by Hilton Battle Creek (formerly McCamly Plaza Hotel and Stouffer Battle Creek Hotel), and the Kellogg Arena. As of 2024, the hotel has been renovated, while McCamly Place was razed in early 2022, as the mall had declined and closed in 2019, alongside McCamly Plaza Hotel.

== History ==
=== 1979–late 1980s: Development, opening and early years ===
In 1979, the McCamly Square Corp. was formed by Bob Miller, Sr. to spearhead the urban renewal project of Battle Creek, Michigan, which began construction in 1980. His proposal was a hotel-atrium-arena complex, which would cost $2 million. On November 23, 1981, the 15-floor, 263-room and suite Stouffer Battle Creek Hotel had its grand opening, featuring a 600-seat ballroom, an indoor pool, and two restaurants. This was followed by the Kellogg Arena on December 22 of that year.

James Rouse's Enterprise Development Company of Columbia, Maryland was brought in to develop the retail space as a 40,000-square-foot (3,700 m^{2}) "mini-mall" connecting the hotel and arena, which would serve as Phase II of the complex. The mall would be formatted as a festival marketplace, mirroring Rouse's development of Harborplace, Faneuil Hall Marketplace, and South Street Seaport in New York. The EDC also developed Flint's Water Street Pavilion, which is in Michigan as well.

McCamly Place was licensed by the Rouse Company, and the mall had its grand opening on April 18, 1986, with over 6,000 people in attendance, including governor James J. Blanchard. The mall had nearly 30 stores and restaurants. Piccadilly Grill & Pub was an anchor restaurant on the second floor. The mall once included a Godness of Grain statue on a pillar on top of the escalators.

However, community leaders in Kalamazoo warned that McCamly Place might fail because of three factors: Battle Creek did not have a lot of tourism, the festival marketplace concept relied too heavily on tourism in contrast from a traditional shopping mall, and McCamly Place was deemed "too small," featuring 29 tenant spaces. Then-mayor John J.H. Schwarz disagreed with such claims. His response was, "I want to tell a city 24 miles to the west that Battle Creek is alive and well. We are on our way. This is a laboratory for other cities this size, so they can learn from us. Success here has national implications."

=== Late 1980s – 2019: Decline and closure ===
Beginning in the late 1980s and early 1990s, McCamly Place failed to meet expected numbers of visitors and experience vacancies, and the EDC eventually downsized the mall, converting vacant spaces into office. A major turning point occurred in 1996, when Piccadilly Grill closed permanently. In between 2009 and 2012, McCamly Plaza Hotel undergone renovations by Grand Heritage Hotel Group.

Festival Market Square, an outdoor space, opened in May 2015, sitting in front of McCamly Place's main entrance. However, the area continued to struggle as a retail center. The Lord Companies and Aries Capital, LLC acquired McCamly Place and McCamly Plaza Hotel in late 2017. They announced a $3.5 million redevelopment that involved converting the hotel into a mixed-use tower. Floors 2 through 5 would be converted into studios and apartments, and the first floor of McCamly Place would be reconstructed into an updated layout, offering future tenants superior visibility and street-side entrances. The tower's remaining floors would be rebranded to DoubleTree by Hilton Hotel.

However, renovation was largely stalled and failed to meet the October 1, 2018 deadline, leading to the economic development organization Battle Creek Unlimited (BCU) to file a lawsuit against Aries Capital for neglect of the hotel and the mall, leading to maintenance issues, and defaulting on a $3.5 million loan in 2018.

=== Sale and demolition ===
McCamly Place and McCamly Plaza Hotel closed their doors in November 2019. The BCU, through 50 Capital Ave. Development Corp. took over ownership of McCamly Place and McCamly Plaza Hotel in November 2020 and continued redevelopment plans. However, the original redevelopment plans by Aries Capital were altered. The new hotel name was extended to DoubleTree by Hilton Battle Creek, and instead of renovating the defunct McCamly Place with a new floor plan, the mall was razed entirely on April 15, 2022, because it has effectively failed as a shopping mall, and McCamly Place proved that the festival marketplace concept was not sustainable for smaller cities. The former McCamly Place site is now green space. The hotel reopened on October 18, 2024.

== See also ==
- Arizona Center
