= Joe Repko =

American football player and coach (1920–1997)

Biographical details
- Born: March 15, 1920; Lansford, Pennsylvania, U.S.
- Died: March 13, 1997 (aged 76); St. Louis, Missouri, U.S.

Playing career
- 1940–1943: Boston College
- 1946–1947: Pittsburgh Steelers
- 1948–1949: Los Angeles Rams
- Position: Tackle

Coaching career (HC unless noted)
- 1954–1956: St. Philip HS (MI)
- 1957–1964: Aquinas Institute HS (NY)
- 1972: St. John Fisher

Head coaching record
- Overall: 3–1–2 (college)

Joseph Stephen Repko (March 15, 1920 – March 13, 1997) was an American football coach and player. He was the head coach at St. John Fisher College in 1972, helping start that program from scratch.

== Playing career ==
Repko was a sophomore on the national champion 1940 Boston College Eagles football team. He went on to play professionally for the Pittsburgh Steelers and the Los Angeles Rams of the National Football League (NFL).

== Head coaching record ==
=== High school ===
Year	Team	Overall	Conference	Standing
St. Philip HS (MI) (Southern Michigan Catholic) (1954–1956)
1954	St. Philip Catholic Central HS	4–3–1	2-3-1	
1955	St. Philip Catholic Central HS	8–0–0	5-0-0	
1956	St. Philip Catholic Central HS	6–3–0	2-3-0	
St. Philip Catholic Central HS:		18–6–1	9-6-1	
Aquinas Institute HS (NY) (Independent) (1957–1964)
1961	Aquinas Institute	7–1–0		
Aquinas Institute:		35–21–0		
Total:		53–27–1		

=== College ===
Year	Team	Overall	Conference	Standing	Bowl/playoffs
St. John Fisher Cardinals (Club) (1972)
1972	St. John Fisher	1–3–2			
St. John Fisher:		3–1–2			
Total:		3–1–2			
