= Battle Creek City Hall =

- U.S. National Register of Historic Places
- U.S. Historic district – Contributing property
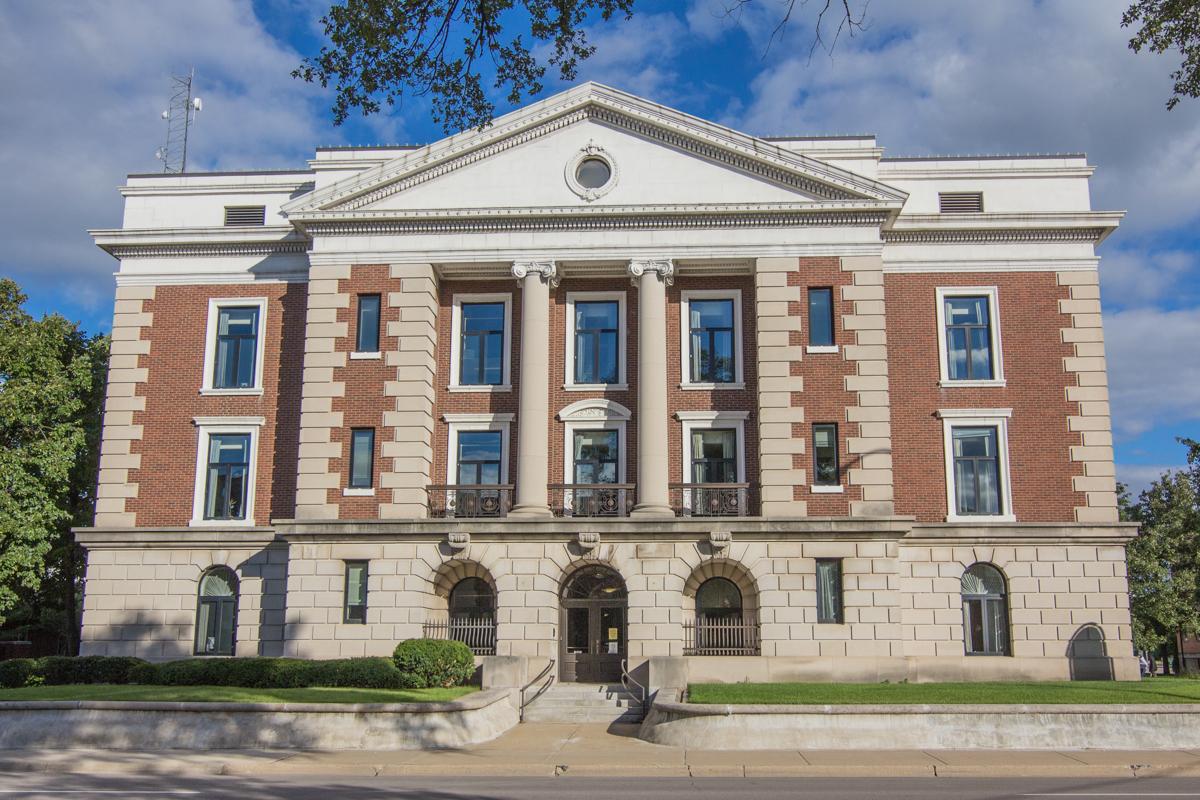
- Interactive map
- Location: 103 E. Michigan Ave., Battle Creek, Michigan
- Coordinates: 42°19′00″N 85°10′46″W
- Area: 2 acres (0.81 ha)
- Built: 1913
- Built by: S.B. Cole Construction Co.
- Architect: Ernest W. Arnold
- Architectural style: Classical Revival, Neoclassical
- Part of: City Hall Historic District (Battle Creek, Michigan) (ID96000366)
- NRHP reference No.: 84001377
- Added to NRHP: April 5, 1984

The Battle Creek City Hall is a governmental building located at 103 East Michigan Avenue in Battle Creek, Michigan. It was listed on the National Register of Historic Places in 1984.

== History ==
Battle Creek was first settled by Europeans in 1835. A village government was established in 1850, and the community was incorporated as a city in 1859. In 1867/68, the first city hall building was constructed, located at 25 West Michigan Avenue. However, the city continued to grow, and by the turn of the century this building was no longer adequate to house city government. In 1907, Mayor Charles c. Green put a special committee together to begin planning for a new city hall. The committee identified possible sites, and the location at 103 E. Michigan was chosen by public referendum. The site was purchased, but it was not until 1912 that the city hired local architect Ernest W. Arnold to prepare plans for a new city hall. Arnold delivered plans later that year, and in early 1913 the city contracted with the S. B. Cole Construction Company of Detroit to construct the building. Construction began in 1913 and was completed in 1914. As the city expanded over the next century, the fire and police headquarters moved out of the building to new structures, but the building remains home to the city government.

== Description ==
The Battle Creek City Hall is a steel frame Neoclassical structure on a concrete foundation, standing three stories tall with an additional attic level. It has a broad front with rusticated limestone masonry on the first floor and red brick on the upper stories with limestone quoining at the corners. The front consists of five sections: projecting three-bay-wide units at each end, slightly recessed two-bay units inward, and a projecting center mass containing the main entrance. The central entrance consists of three recessed, arched entrance-ways in the base section sheltered by a six-column Ionic portico. Upper story window surrounds are made of cast concrete, and the facade contains a wealth of classical detailing, including rosettes, dentils, beadwork, and egg-and-tongue moldings in the entablature and spandrel panels. The rear of the building has a similar five-part facade with entryway, but lacks the portico. The sides are shorter, and have similar entryways.

== See also ==
- List of mayors of Battle Creek, Michigan
