= Margaret P. Colvin =

19th-century inventor

- Born: Margaret Plunkett Richardson; October 9, 1820; Macedon, NY
- Died: August 2, 1894 (age 74); Battle Creek, MI
- Resting place: Oak Hill Cemetery, Battle Creek, MI
- Occupation: Inventor
- Known for: Triumph Rotary Washer

Margaret Plunkett Richardson Colvin (October 9, 1820 – August 2, 1894) was a 19th-century inventor. She received four patents over her lifetime, all related to laundry improvements. Colvin's most important invention was the Triumph Rotary Washer which she exhibited at the Philadelphia Centennial in 1876 and the Columbian Exposition in 1893.

== Early life ==
Colvin was born in Macedon, New York. Her parents were Plunkett and Mary Richardson. She married Ashley Colvin, a farmer. Together, they had seven children. Colvin and her family settled in Battle Creek, Michigan, where Colvin applied for all of her patents.

== Inventions ==
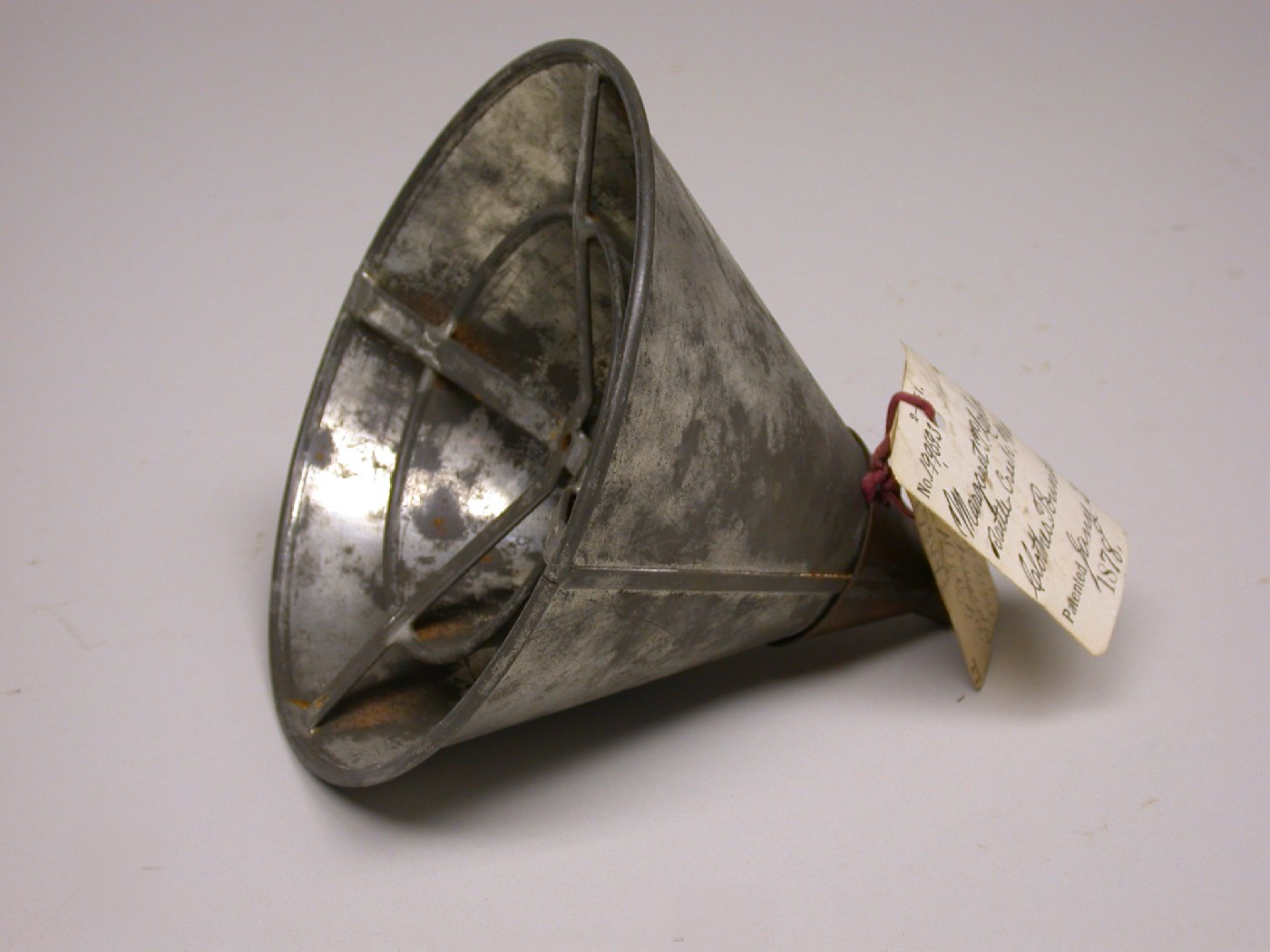
Patent Model - Clothes-Pounder, 1878, Hagley Museum and Library

Of Colvin's four laundry improvements, her first one was the most important. It was for an improvement upon washing-machines and consisted of a rotating hollow cylinder inside a boiler which could clean a variety of fabrics including carpets and laces without rubbing and damaging them.

The other three patents Colvin received were for clothes-pounders. Two were issued in 1878; and her last one in 1881, a double-armed clothing pounder meant to be more durable and cost effective.

== Death and legacy ==
Colvin's Triumph Rotary Washer was such a success at the Philadelphia Centennial, that her husband left the farming business and went on to manufacture and market her washing machine. Colvin's invention is considered and important step in the evolution of the modern washing machine.

Colvin, her husband and six of her children are buried in Oak Hill Cemetery, in Battlecreek.

== Collections ==
- Patent Model - Clothes-Pounder, 1878, Hagley Museum and Library, Wilmington, DE
