= Sean DePaula =

American baseball player (born 1973)

- Relief pitcher
- Born: November 7, 1973 (age 52); Newton, Massachusetts, U.S.
- Batted: Right Threw: Right

MLB debut
- August 31, 1999, for the Cleveland Indians

Last MLB appearance
- August 1, 2002, for the Cleveland Indians

MLB statistics
- Win–loss record: 1–1
- Earned run average: 6.75
- Strikeouts: 42
- Stats at Baseball Reference

Teams
- Cleveland Indians (1999–2000, 2002)

Sean Michael DePaula (born November 7, 1973) is an American former Major League Baseball player. A pitcher, DePaula played for the Cleveland Indians appearing in major league games in 1999, 2000, and 2002.

== Amateur career ==
DePaula attended high school at Cushing Academy, and was drafted by the Boston Red Sox in the eighth round of the 1993 Major League Baseball draft. He chose not to sign with them, and instead played college baseball at Wake Forest University. In 1994, he played collegiate summer baseball with the Cotuit Kettleers of the Cape Cod Baseball League, and returned to the league in 1995 to play for the Hyannis Mets. After three years at Wake Forest, he was drafted by the Cleveland Indians in the ninth round of the 1996 Major League Baseball draft, and signed with them.

== Professional career ==
He spent the first three years of his professional career gradually moving up the minor league ranks, and in 1999 he spent the season split between the Kinston Indians, Akron Aeros, and Buffalo Bisons. With Kinston, he had a 4–2 win-loss record, a 2.28 earned run average (ERA), and 75 strikeouts in 23 games; his performance led to him making the major league roster in September.

DePaula made his major league debut on August 31, 1999, and had a 4.63 ERA in 11 games. He also pitched five innings in the 1999 American League Division Series facing off against Pedro Martínez. DePaula pitched in 13 games in 2000, but tore a tendon in his elbow in April and September 2001, causing him to miss that season. He spent most of 2002 in Buffalo, but did pitch five games for the Indians. At the end of the season, he was released and signed with the Cincinnati Reds. In 2003, DePaula played 10 games for the Reds' Triple-A affiliate, the Louisville Bats, and had a 6.17 ERA. He was released partway through the season and retired.
