= Thomas Kneir =

American law enforcement official

- Born: Battle Creek, Michigan
- Police career
- Allegiance: United States
- Department: Federal Bureau of Investigation
- Service years: 1973-2004
- Status: Retired from law enforcement

Thomas Kneir is an American law enforcement official who was the Federal Bureau of Investigation office chief in Chicago, Illinois. After his career in the FBI, Kneir became the chief of product security at Abbott Laboratories.

== Early life and education ==
Thomas Kneir was born in Battle Creek, Michigan, in 1949. He played baseball at Western Michigan University, but then transferred to University of Illinois in Chicago after hearing of an opening at the FBI office in Chicago for clerical work. After graduation from UIC with an accounting degree he stayed with the FBI. He was made a special agent in April 1973.

== Career ==
=== FBI ===
Kneir's first assignment was in Dallas, Texas, where he helped to stop a $25 million fraud scheme. After Dallas, Kneir was moved to Atlanta. After successfully finishing his time in Atlanta, Kneir was moved to the Louisville, Kentucky office in 1979 where he was promoted to supervisor. In 1984, Kneir was assigned to headquarters in Washington D.C. where he supervised the Governmental Fraud Unit. In 1986, Kneir was assigned to the Baltimore FBI office as supervisor. During his tenure in this office, the FBI Baltimore office was tracking the money from the Iran-Contra scandal. Returning to Washington from 1989 to 1991, he headed the Public Corruption unit. In September 1994 he became the No. 2 supervisor in the Albuquerque office and was promoted to head of the office. After Albuquerque, Knier became the head of the Jacksonville office. On September 10, 2001, he was appointed head of the Chicago office.

=== Head of Chicago office ===
The primary focus of Kneir's time in Chicago was dealing with terrorism and public corruption. Working in cooperation with prosecutor Patrick Fitzgerald, the Chicago office led by Kneir launched several large investigations which lead to trials including the Duffs trial, the Governor Ryan corruption trial, and Operation Family Secrets. As head of the Chicago field office, Kneir attended many events related to security including the Prizker Military Museum and Library program "Front & Center with John Callaway: Homeland Security: Is Chicago Prepared?" Kneir retired from public service in 2004.

=== Abbott Laboratories ===
After his time with the FBI, Kneir took a job at North Chicago-based Abbott Laboratories as director of product security.
