= Lakeview School District (Battle Creek, Michigan) =

School district in Michigan

Address
- 15 Arbor Street Battle Creek, Calhoun, Michigan, 49015; United States
- Coordinates: 42°18′13″N 85°12′48″W

District information
- Grades: PK - 12
- Superintendent: Dr. William Patterson
- Schools: 7
- Budget: $66,371,000 (2022-2023) expenditures
- NCES District ID: 2620850

Students and staff
- Students: 3,717 (2024-2025)
- Teachers: 235.51 (on an FTE basis) (2024-2025)
- Staff: 489.48 FTE (2024-2025)
- Student–teacher ratio: 15.78 (2024-2025)
- Athletic conference: Southwestern Michigan Athletic Conference
- District mascot: Spartans
- Colors: Purple and white

Other information
- Website: lakeviewspartans.org

The Lakeview School District is a public school district serving part of Battle Creek, Michigan.

== History ==
The district formed in September, 1921 and the first school was built that year at the northwest corner of West Columbia Avenue and Highland Avenue. The district's namesake is Goguac Lake. The first class graduated from that school in 1924. A new high school opened on Woodrow Avenue in 1943.

Lakeview Middle School opened in fall 1961 as the district's high school. The architect was Guido A. Binda and Associates. The building featured a 1,200-person fallout shelter located in the basement beneath the cafeteria. It had independent utility systems for use in a nuclear attack. As of 2021, the fallout shelter was being used as a weight room and cafeteria.

The present Lakeview High School opened in January 2006. The architect was BETA Design Group.

== Schools ==
Schools in the Lakeview School District
School	Address	Notes
Lakeview High School (Battle Creek, Michigan)	15060 South Helmer Road, Battle Creek	Grades 9-12. Built 2005.
Lakeview Alternative High School	15 Arbor Street, Battle Creek	Grades 9-12. Formerly Territorial School.
Lakeview Middle School	300 South 28th Street, Battle Creek	Grades 5-8. Built 1961, formerly Lakeview High School.
Minges Brook Elementary	435 Lincoln Hill Drive, Battle Creek	Grades PreK-4
Prairieview Elementary	1675 Iroquois Avenue, Battle Creek	Grades PreK-4
Riverside Elementary	650 Riverside Drive, Battle Creek	Grades PreK-4
Westlake Elementary	1184 South 24th Street, Battle Creek	Grades K-4

Lakeview High School students can take classes at the Battle Creek Area Mathematics and Science Center and Calhoun Area Career Center.

== Athletics ==
Lakeview High School's Spartans compete in the Southwestern Michigan Athletic Conference. School colors are purple and white. The following Michigan High School Athletic Association (MHSAA) sanctioned sports are offered:

- Baseball (boys)
  - State champion - 1986, 2000, 2006
- Basketball (girls and boys)
- Bowling (girls and boys)
- Competitive cheerleading (girls)
- Cross country (girls and boys)
  - Girls state champion - 2002
- Football (boys)
- Golf (girls and boys)
- Boys state champion - 1968 (tie), 1987, 1989, 2008, 2013
- Lacrosse (boys)
- Soccer (girls and boys)
- Softball (girls)
- Swim and dive (girls and boys)
- Boys state champion - 1967 (tie), 2008
- Tennis (girls and boys)
  - Boys state champion - 1948 (tie)
- Track and field (girls and boys)
  - Boys state champion - 1953
- Volleyball (girls)
  - State champion - 1982
- Wrestling (boys)

== Notable alumni ==
- Nate Huffman, National Basketball Association (NBA) center
- Rick Snyder, 48th Governor of Michigan
