= Lakeview High School (Battle Creek, Michigan) =

Location
- 15060 Helmer Road S Battle Creek, Michigan; 49015-9641; United States
- 42.291355°N 85.235284°W

Information
- Other name: LHS
- Type: Secondary education
- Motto: Vivite Discere, Discite Vivere (Lived to learn, Learned to live)
- School board: Lakeview Board of Education
- School district: Lakeview School District (Battle Creek)
- Authority: Michigan Department of Education
- Principal: Cody Japinga
- Staff: 69
- Teaching staff: 56
- Grades: 9-12
- Enrollment: 1,310 (2019-2020 school year)
- Language: English
- Colors: White, Purple
- Athletics conference: Southwestern Michigan Athletic Conference
- Sports: Yes
- Mascot: Sparty
- Newspaper: The Crystal
- Yearbook: The Log
- Website: lakeviewspartans.org

Lakeview High School is a secondary education institution located within the Lakeview School District in Battle Creek, Michigan
The name Lakeview reportedly comes from a teacher that was looking out a window of the first Lakeview school and decided that there was a "Lake view".

== Academics ==
Lakview High School offers many options of education for students. In the 2020–2021 school year, students had the option to attend in-person two days per week or the Lakeview Virtual Academy. Students could take select classes at the Calhoun Area Career Center, Michigan Virtual High School, and Math and Science courses at the Battle Creek Area Mathematics and Science Center. Lakeview High School offers 21 Advanced Placement courses. Students are also allowed to take college courses, most commonly with Kellogg Community College, through dual enrollment.

== Athletics ==
Lakeview offers 15 sports during the fall, winter, and spring.

- Baseball (Men)
- Basketball
- Bowling
- Boys Lacrosse (Men) Club sport
- Competitive Cheer (Women)
- Cross Country
- Football (Men)
- Golf
- Soccer
- Softball (Women)
- Swim
- Tennis
- Track and Field
- Volleyball (Women)
- Wrestling (Men)

== Awards ==
- 2018-2019 Model 21st Century School Library
- Karl Shafer - Honor Credit Union Annual Teacher Awards
- College Success Award 2018, 2019, and 2020
- Dr. Margaret "Gigi" Lincoln of the 2008 I Love My Librarian Award
- Dr. Margaret "Gigi" Lincoln of the 2012 Making it Happen Award
- 2013 Citation of Excellence
