= Leila Arboretum =

Arboretum and garden in Michigan, United States

Coordinates: 42.33895°N 85.21359°W

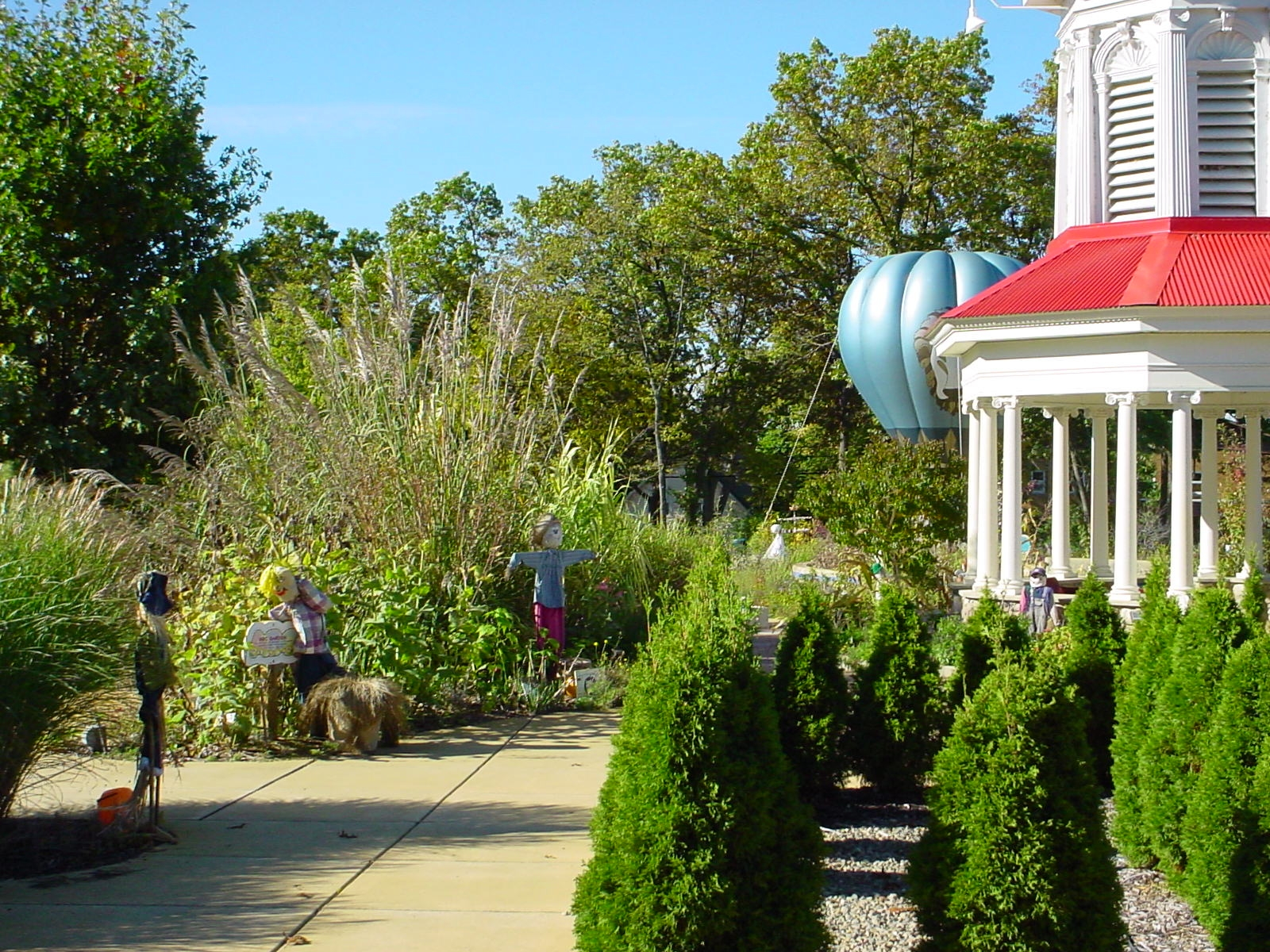
- The Children's Garden area.
- Interactive map of Leila Arboretum
- Website: Official website

The Leila Arboretum is an arboretum and garden located at 928 West Michigan Avenue, Battle Creek, Michigan. The arboretum is 72 acres, and is open to the public.

The Arboretum's collections include nearly 1,700 accessioned woody plants and about 25,000 total plants, comprising trees, shrubs, and perennial and annual plantings laid out in the manner of European gardens. Many plantings date back to the 1920s. Recently the Arboretum has focused on increasing the diversity of woody plants and developing demonstration gardens including a lilac garden, perennial walkway, native plant garden, and labyrinth. Perennial gardens feature daylilies, purple coneflowers, and daisies; the annual flower displays include a yearly planting of some 7,000 spring bulbs including tulips and daffodils, as well as approximately 5,000 annuals and 1,500 chrysanthemums. In addition, the Kingman Museum, a natural history museum and planetarium, is located on the Arboretum grounds.

The Leila Arboretum dates back to 1922 when Leila Post Montgomery, widow of breakfast cereal magnate C. W. Post, purchased 72 acres (291,000 m^{2}) of an old country club and donated the land to the City of Battle Creek “to be laid out and improved as a public Arboretum...”. This gift was part of the larger vision of Edward M. Brigham who started planning an educational campus consisting of a museum, an historical building for the Battle Creek Historical Society, a fine arts building, a hall of music, and a lyceum (lecture hall) building. Mrs. Charles E. Kolb, W. I. Fell and Burritt Hamilton donated additional land, and the combined property, which became known as Leila Arboretum, was designed and developed by T. Clifton Shepard between 1924 and 1930. However, the Great Depression soon overshadowed these plans and the gardens fell into great disrepair. They were finally revived in 1982 by a band of volunteers who styled themselves the Leila Arboretum Society and who set about the ultimately successful task of reclaiming the fine landscapes hidden under years of overgrown brush.

== See also ==
- List of botanical gardens in the United States
