= Kingman Museum =

Natural history museum and planetarium in Battle Creek, Michigan

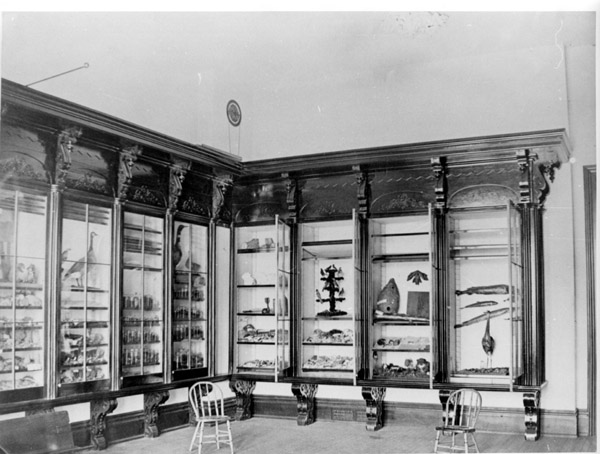
- Established: 1934 by Edward M. Brigham
- Location: 175 Limit Street, Battle Creek, Michigan
- Coordinates: 42.336985°N 85.211383°W
- Founder: Edward M. Brigham
- Public transit access: BCT: 1
- Website: www.kingmanmusem.org

Kingman Museum is a natural history museum and planetarium located at 175 Limit Street, on the grounds of Leila Arboretum, in Battle Creek, Michigan, United States. Its mission is to promote an understanding and appreciation of the natural world, the universe, and human cultures.

The museum's collections include several thousand artifacts, many of which are displayed in permanent and temporary exhibitions. The vast majority of the collection, however, is in storage. In 2007 the museum received a grant from the Institute of Museum and Library Services to physically inventory and catalog every item in its collection, scheduled for completion in August 2009.

Some of the museum's highlights include its paleontology and geology specimens, animal taxidermy mounts, a preserved human embryo and fetus exhibit, and Native American artifacts.

The museum also has numerous rare items in its collection, including two specimens of the critically endangered imperial woodpecker (Campephilus imperialis). Only 120 museum specimens of the bird are known to exist in the world. Since there are no known photographs or recordings of a living imperial woodpecker, these specimens are the only records ornithologists have to study and understand the species.

In 2008 Kingman Museum added a Digistar 3 fulldome projector system to its planetarium. It is one of only 61 installations worldwide and the only one in southwest Michigan.

Kingman is a member museum of the Association of Science-Technology Centers and participates in the membership passport program.
