= List of mayors of Battle Creek, Michigan =

The following is a list of mayors of the city of Battle Creek, Michigan, United States.

- Elijah W. Pendill (1809–1876), 1859–1861, 1864
- Alonzo Noble (1809–1884), 1862
- Chester Buckley (1812–1866), 1863
- Tolman W. Hall (1805–1890), 1865
- Theron H. Tracy (1819–1877), 1866
- Erastus Hussey (1800–1889), 1867
- William Wallace (1807–1895), 1868
- Thomas Hart (1828–1888), 1869-1870
- Nelson Eldred (1822–1903), 1871
- George N. Wakefield (1806–1877), 1872
- Dr. Edward Cox (1816–1882), 1873-1874
- Victor P. Collier (1819–1898), 1875
- Charles Austin (1834–1921), 1876-1877
- James L. Whitcomb (1819–1899), 1878
- Clement R. Thompson (1831–1898), 1879
- Edwin C. Nichols (1838–1924), 1880
- George E. Howes (1835–1906), 1881
- William C. Gage (1842–1907), 1882
- Dr. Simeon S. French (1816–1910), 1883-1884
- Frank M. Rathbun (1844–1893), 1885
- Henry Clay Hall (1834–1912), 1886-1888
- James Green (1840–1900), 1889
- John W. Bailey (1859–1929), 1890
- Fred M. Wadleigh (1846–1913), 1891
- Joseph L. Cox (1858–1912), 1892
- Austin S. Parker (1842–1918), 1893-1894
- John H. Mykins (1846–1920), 1895
- Frank Turner (1834–1912), 1896
- Dr. A. T. Metcalf (1831–1916), 1897
- Miles S. Curtis (1852–1943), 1898
- Ephraim W. Moore (1850–1938), 1899
- Dr. Leon M. Gillette (1860–1924), 1900-1901
- Fred H. Webb (1854–1925), 1902-1903
- Frank W. Clapp (1844–1916), 1904
- George S. Barnes (1867–1925), 1905-1906
- Charles C. Green (1876–1936), 1907-1908
- John W. Bailey, 1909-1910
- Dr. Thomas Zelinsky (1876–1933), 1911-1913
- John W. Bailey, 1913-1915
- James W. Marsh (1852–1932), 1915-1917
- Charles Edward Wilson (1872–1964), 1917-1919
- Dr. Charles W. Ryan (1872–1943), 1919-1921
- Charles C. Green, 1921-1927
- John W. Bailey, 1927-1929
- William P. Penty (1879–1957), 1930-1933
- J. William Murphy Jr. (1885–1960), 1933-1937
- Robert J. Hamilton (1890–1967), 1937-1939
- Floyd H. Barry (1897–1962), 1939-1943
- Bernard E. Godde (1896–1980), 1943-1947
- William V. Bailey (born 1914), 1947-1953
- Frank C. Wagner (1890–1975), 1953-1957
- Russell V. Worgess (1919–1995), 1957-1959
- Raymond M. Turner (1916–1978), 1959-1960
- Preston J. Kool (1931–2018), ca.1967
- Donald Sherrod (1926–2000), 1979-1981, first Black mayor
- Maude Bristol Perry, 1984-1985, first Black woman mayor
- John J. H. Schwarz, 1985-1987
- Shirley McFee 1990-1991
- Brian K. Kirkham, ca.2002
- John K. Godfrey, ca.2005-2007
- Mark A. Behnke, ca.2008
- Susan Baldwin, 2009-2013
- Deb Owens, 2014-2015
- Dave Walters, ca.2017
- Mark Behnke, ca.2021–Present

== See also ==
- Battle Creek history
- Battle Creek City Hall
