= 1999 American League Division Series =

Teams
Team (Wins)		Manager	Season
New York Yankees (3)		Joe Torre	98–64 (.605), GA: 4
Texas Rangers (0)		Johnny Oates	95–67 (.586), GA: 8
- Dates: October 5–9
- Television: NBC (Games 1, 3); Fox (Game 2)
- TV announcers: Bob Costas and Joe Morgan (Games 1, 3); Thom Brennaman and Bob Brenly (Game 2)
- Radio: ESPN
- Radio announcers: Dan Shulman and Buck Martinez
- Umpires: Games 1–2: Jim Joyce, Chuck Meriwether, Tim Welke, Jim McKean, John Shulock, Durwood Merrill; Game 3: Rocky Roe, Larry Young, John Hirschbeck, Joe Brinkman, Mike Reilly, Derryl Cousins

Teams
Team (Wins)		Manager	Season
Boston Red Sox (3)		Jimy Williams	94–68 (.580), GB: 4
Cleveland Indians (2)		Mike Hargrove	97–65 (.599), GA: 21 1/2
- Dates: October 6–11
- Television: Fox (Games 1, 3–5); ESPN (Game 2)
- TV announcers: Joe Buck, Tim McCarver (Games 1, 5), and Bob Brenly (Game 5); Jon Miller and Joe Morgan (Game 2); Thom Brennaman and Bob Brenly (Games 3–4)
- Radio: ESPN
- Radio announcers: Ernie Harwell and Dave Campbell
- Umpires: Games 1–2: Rocky Roe, Larry Young, John Hirschbeck, Joe Brinkman, Mike Reilly, Derryl Cousins; Games 3–5: Jim Joyce, Chuck Meriwether, Tim Welke, Jim McKean, John Shulock, Durwood Merrill

The 1999 American League Division Series (ALDS), consisted of two best-of-five playoff series on the American League side in Major League Baseball’s (MLB) 1999 postseason, began on Tuesday, October 5, and ended on Monday, October 11, with the champions of the three AL divisions—along with a "wild card" team—participating in two series.

Under MLB's playoff format, no two teams from the same division were matched up in the Division Series, regardless of whether their records would normally indicate such a matchup. Home field advantage went to the team with the better regular-season record with the exception of the wild card team, which defers home field advantage regardless of record. The matchups were:

- (1) New York Yankees (AL East champions) vs. (3) Texas Rangers (AL West champions): Yankees won the series, 3–0.
- (2) Cleveland Indians (AL Central champions) vs. (4) Boston Red Sox (Wild Card qualifier): Red Sox won the series, 3–2.

The higher seeded team in each series hosts Games 1, 2, and 5 (if necessary), and the lower seeded team hosts Games 3 and 4 (if necessary).

The participating teams were identical to those qualifying in 1998, marking the only instance to date in either league in which all four teams competing in a Division Series are the same in consecutive seasons, let alone both matchups also being the same.

The Yankees would go on to defeat the Red Sox four games to one in their first-ever meeting in the postseason in the AL Championship Series, and would then go on to sweep the National League champion Atlanta Braves in the 1999 World Series to repeat and win their third championship in four years.

== Matchups ==
=== New York Yankees vs. Texas Rangers ===
New York won the series, 3–0.

Game	Date	Score	Location	Time	Attendance
1	October 5	Texas Rangers – 0, New York Yankees – 8	Yankee Stadium (I)	3:37	57,099
2	October 7	Texas Rangers – 1, New York Yankees – 3	Yankee Stadium (I)	3:32	57,485
3	October 9	New York Yankees – 3, Texas Rangers – 0	The Ballpark in Arlington	3:00	50,269

=== Cleveland Indians vs. Boston Red Sox ===
Boston won the series, 3–2.

Game	Date	Score	Location	Time	Attendance
1	October 6	Boston Red Sox – 2, Cleveland Indians – 3	Jacobs Field	2:53	45,182
2	October 7	Boston Red Sox – 1, Cleveland Indians – 11	Jacobs Field	2:47	45,184
3	October 9	Cleveland Indians – 3, Boston Red Sox – 9	Fenway Park	3:08	33,539
4	October 10	Cleveland Indians – 7, Boston Red Sox – 23	Fenway Park	3:49	33,898
5	October 11	Boston Red Sox – 12, Cleveland Indians – 8	Jacobs Field	3:12	45,114

== New York vs. Texas ==
=== Game 1 ===
October 5, 1999 8:10 pm (EDT) at Yankee Stadium (I) in Bronx, New York 49 °F (9 °C), clear
Team	1	2	3	4	5	6	7	8	9	R	H	E
Texas	0	0	0	0	0	0	0	0	0	0	2	1
New York	0	1	0	0	2	4	0	1	X	8	10	0
WP: Orlando Hernández (1–0) LP: Aaron Sele (0–1); Home runs: TEX: None; NYY: Bernie Williams (1); Attendance: 57,099; Boxscore

The Yankees once again swept the Rangers and held them to one run through three games. In Game 1, Aaron Sele went against Orlando Hernández. Ricky Ledee's RBI double in the second innings put the Yankees up 1–0. In the fifth, innings Derek Jeter and Paul O'Neill hit back-to-back two-out doubles before both scored on the Bernie Williams's double. Next inning, Ledee and Jeter walked off Sele and the reliever Tim Crabtree respectively before Texas third baseman Todd Zeile's error on O'Neill's ground ball allowed Ledee to score off Mike Venafro before Williams's three-run home run made it 7–0. Williams got his sixth innings RBI of this game with a single in the eighth off Jeff Fassero that scored Chuck Knoblauch. Jeff Nelson relieved Hernandez in the ninth inning and pitched a scoreless inning to seal the Yankees' 8–0 win.

=== Game 2 ===
October 7, 1999 8:17 pm (EDT) at Yankee Stadium (I) in Bronx, New York 48 °F (9 °C), clear
Team	1	2	3	4	5	6	7	8	9	R	H	E
Texas	0	0	0	1	0	0	0	0	0	1	7	0
New York	0	0	0	0	1	0	1	1	X	3	7	2
WP: Andy Pettitte (1–0) LP: Rick Helling (0–1) Sv: Mariano Rivera (1); Home runs: TEX: Juan González (1); NYY: None; Attendance: 57,485; Boxscore

In Game 2, Rick Helling went against Andy Pettitte. Juan González gave the Rangers the lead with a home run in the fourth. This would be the lone run in the series for the Rangers, who scored 945 runs in 1999. Scott Brosius's double tied the game in the bottom of the fifth. Ricky Ledée's RBI double gave the Yankees the lead in the seventh. In the bottom of the eighth, the Yanks got an insurance run when Mike Venafro walked Jim Leyritz with the bases loaded, scoring Chad Curtis. Mariano Rivera retired the side in order for the Game 2 save.

=== Game 3 ===
October 9, 1999 7:40 pm (CDT) at The Ballpark in Arlington in Arlington, Texas 79 °F (26 °C), cloudy
Team	1	2	3	4	5	6	7	8	9	R	H	E
New York	3	0	0	0	0	0	0	0	0	3	6	0
Texas	0	0	0	0	0	0	0	0	0	0	5	1
WP: Roger Clemens (1–0) LP: Esteban Loaiza (0–1) Sv: Mariano Rivera (2); Home runs: NYY: Darryl Strawberry (1); TEX: None; Attendance: 50,269; Boxscore

In Game 3, the Yankees took an early lead when Darryl Strawberry hit a three-run home run off Esteban Loaiza in the first inning. Roger Clemens pitched seven innings and allowed only three hits. Mariano Rivera got the series-winning save in the ninth inning. For the second consecutive year, the Yankees completed a three-game sweep of the Rangers while holding them to one run of offense in the series.

=== Composite box ===
1999 ALDS (3–0): New York Yankees over Texas Rangers

Team	1	2	3	4	5	6	7	8	9	R	H	E
New York Yankees	3	1	0	0	3	4	1	2	0	14	23	2
Texas Rangers	0	0	0	1	0	0	0	0	0	1	14	2
Total attendance: 164,853 Average attendance: 54,951

== Cleveland vs. Boston ==
=== Game 1 ===
October 6, 1999 8:07 pm (EDT) at Jacobs Field in Cleveland, Ohio 49 °F (9 °C), cloudy
Team	1	2	3	4	5	6	7	8	9	R	H	E
Boston	0	1	0	1	0	0	0	0	0	2	5	1
Cleveland	0	0	0	0	0	2	0	0	1	3	6	1
WP: Paul Shuey (1–0) LP: Derek Lowe (0–1); Home runs: BOS: Nomar Garciaparra (1); CLE: Jim Thome (1); Attendance: 45,182; Boxscore

Boston jumped out to an early 1–0 lead with a lead-off home run by Nomar Garciaparra in the second inning off Indians' starter Bartolo Colón. Garciaparra set up the second run for the Red Sox when he led off the fourth inning with a double and then scored on an RBI single by Mike Stanley. Facing Cy Young Award winner Pedro Martínez, the Indians looked to be in serious trouble, but the ace of the Red Sox pitching staff left the game due to injury in the bottom of the fifth inning and was replaced by Derek Lowe. The Indians would tie the game in the bottom of the sixth with a two-run home run by Jim Thome, and Colón settled down and dominated the Red Sox hitters the rest of the way, striking out 11 in eight innings pitched. In the bottom of the ninth, the Indians walked the game off with Travis Fryman hit a game-winning single off Rich Garces with the bases loaded.

=== Game 2 ===
October 7, 1999 4:07 pm (EDT) at Jacobs Field in Cleveland, Ohio 58 °F (14 °C), sunny
Team	1	2	3	4	5	6	7	8	9	R	H	E
Boston	0	0	1	0	0	0	0	0	0	1	6	0
Cleveland	0	0	6	5	0	0	0	0	X	11	8	0
WP: Charles Nagy (1–0) LP: Bret Saberhagen (0–1); Home runs: BOS: None; CLE: Harold Baines (1), Jim Thome (2); Attendance: 45,184; Boxscore

In Game 2, the Red Sox blew another lead. Behind Bret Saberhagen, the Red Sox built a 1–0 lead when José Offerman singled home Trot Nixon in the third off Indians starter Charles Nagy. Nagy allowed only this run over seven strong innings. The Indians struck back and essentially put the game away in the bottom half. Omar Vizquel gave the Indians the lead when he tripled home Sandy Alomar Jr. and Kenny Lofton. Roberto Alomar doubled Vizquel home, and, after an out and a Jim Thome walk, Harold Baines hit a three-run home run to make it 6–1. That marked the end for Saberhagen. Next inning, the Indians loaded the bases off John Wasdin on two walks and a hit when Alomar's sacrifice fly scored Travis Fryman. After a walk re-loaded the bases, Thome's grand slam capped the scoring at 11–1 Indians, who were now one win away from the ALCS for the third straight year.

=== Game 3 ===
October 9, 1999 4:17 pm (EDT) at Fenway Park in Boston, Massachusetts 72 °F (22 °C), clear
Team	1	2	3	4	5	6	7	8	9	R	H	E
Cleveland	0	0	0	1	0	1	1	0	0	3	9	1
Boston	0	0	0	0	2	1	6	0	X	9	11	2
WP: Derek Lowe (1–1) LP: Jaret Wright (0–1); Home runs: CLE: None; BOS: John Valentin (1), Brian Daubach (1); Attendance: 33,539; Boxscore

When the series shifted to Fenway Park, so did the momentum. The Indians, too, would lose a starting pitcher to injury and blow a lead in Game 3. They struck first on a David Justice sacrifice fly off Ramón Martínez in the fourth, but, after shutting out the Red Sox for four innings, starting pitcher Dave Burba left with a strained forearm. Mike Hargrove chose to insert projected Game 4 starter Jaret Wright instead of rookie middle reliever Sean DePaula. The Red Sox quickly took the lead off Wright in the fifth on a Darren Lewis single and Trot Nixon sacrifice fly. Harold Baines's force out with runners on the corners tied the game in the sixth for the Indians. A lead-off home run by John Valentin untied the score for the Red Sox in the bottom of the sixth, but his error on Manny Ramirez's groundout with runners on first and third tied it back 3–3 in the top of the seventh. After Wright walked Merloni and hit Jason Varitek, Ricardo Rincón came on and got two outs, then Offerman walked to load the bases, John Valentin became the hero again with a double that scored Varitek and Lewis. Brian Daubach then hit a three-run home run to make it 8–3. Sean DePaula relieved Rincon and allowed a walk and single before Lou Merloni's RBI single made it 9–3. Derek Lowe earned the win 2 1/3 innings of relief while Rod Beck pitched a scoreless ninth to seal the victory.

=== Game 4 ===
October 10, 1999 7:42 pm (EDT) at Fenway Park in Boston, Massachusetts 66 °F (19 °C), windy, cloudy
Team	1	2	3	4	5	6	7	8	9	R	H	E
Cleveland	1	1	0	0	4	0	0	0	1	7	8	0
Boston	2	5	3	5	3	0	3	2	X	23	24	0
WP: Rich Garces (1–0) LP: Bartolo Colón (0–1); Home runs: CLE: Wil Cordero (1); BOS: John Valentin 2 (3), José Offerman (1), Jason Varitek (1); Attendance: 33,898; Boxscore

Because presumed starter Jaret Wright had been used in relief the previous day, and no emergency starter had been included on the playoff roster, the Indians felt forced to start Bartolo Colón on three days' rest for the first time in his career, even though he had gone eight innings in cold weather in the first game. This time, he was not up to the challenge. Neither he nor the thin bullpen behind him could stop the barrage of Red Sox runs. Colón himself was hammered for seven runs in one-plus innings pitched, and reliever Steve Reed was tagged for eight. The Indians struck in the top of the first: Kenny Lofton hit a leadoff double, moved to third on a sacrifice bunt, and scored on Roberto Alomar's groundout off Red Sox starter Kent Mercker, but in the bottom of the inning, John Valentin's two-run home run after a leadoff walk put the Red Sox up 2–1. The Indians tied the game in the second on Sandy Alomar's sacrifice fly off Mercker, who was taken out after just 1 2/3 innings and relieved by Rich Garces. In the bottom of the inning, three consecutive singles put the Red Sox back in front, then Trot Nixon's double scored two. José Offerman's two-run home run knocked Colón out of the game. Next inning, Nixon's sacrifice fly with runners on first and third put the Red Sox up 8–2, then Valentine's second home run of the game increased the lead to 10–2. Next inning, Jason Varitek's RBI double with two on made it 11–2 Red Sox. After Nixon walked with two outs to load the bases, Offerman's single scored one, then Valentin's double cleared the bases, making the score 15–2. Valentine went 4 for 5 with 7 RBIs. In the top of the fifth, Cleveland responded against Tim Wakefield. With runners on first and third, Wil Cordero and Richie Sexson hit back-to-back RBI singles; after Jim Thome walked to load the bases, John Wasdin relieved Wakefield, who faced 4 hitters and retired none, and allowed a sacrifice fly to Travis Fryman, then walked Sandy Alomar to reload the bases. Rhéal Cormier relieved Wasdin and walked Lofton to force in another run before striking out Omar Vizquel and Roberto Alomar to end the inning, the score now 15–6. In the bottom half, Mike Stanley hit an RBI triple before Varitek's two-run home run made it 18–6. In the seventh, Nixon's double off Paul Assenmacher scored two before Nixon scored on Offerman's single. In the eighth, pitcher Paul Shuey allowed a walk and subsequent double before Scott Hatteberg's RBI single made it 22–6 Red Sox, Shuey then walked two to force in the Red Sox's last run while the Indians scored their last run of the game on a Wil Cordero home run in the ninth off Tom Gordon. The Red Sox's 23–7 blowout forced a Game 5 in Cleveland. The 23 runs scored by the Red Sox were, and still remain, an MLB record for most runs scored by one team in a single postseason game.

=== Game 5 ===
October 11, 1999 8:17 pm (EDT) at Jacobs Field in Cleveland, Ohio 58 °F (14 °C), clear
Team	1	2	3	4	5	6	7	8	9	R	H	E
Boston	2	0	5	1	0	0	3	0	1	12	10	0
Cleveland	3	2	3	0	0	0	0	0	0	8	7	1
WP: Pedro Martínez (1–0) LP: Paul Shuey (1–1); Home runs: BOS: Nomar Garciaparra (2), Troy O'Leary 2 (2); CLE: Jim Thome 2 (4), Travis Fryman (1); Attendance: 45,114; Boxscore

In Game 5, Charles Nagy started for Cleveland and Bret Saberhagen started for Boston, both on only three days' rest. In the top of the first inning, Brian Daubach singled with two outs before Nomar Garciaparra homered to put the Red Sox up 2–0, but in the bottom of the inning, Kenny Lofton drew a leadoff walk, stole second, and scored on Omar Vizquel's double. Two outs later, Jim Thome's home run put the Indians up 3–2. Next inning, Wil Cordero hit a leadoff single before Travis Fryman's two-run home run made it 5–2 Indians and knocked Saberhagen out of the game. In the third, however, the Red Sox struck back. Trot Nixon walked to lead off and went to third on Jose Offerman's single. John Valentin's force-out cut the Indians' lead to 5–3 with Offerman out at second. After Nagy allowed a double from Daubach and intentionally walked Garciaparra to load the bases, Troy O'Leary's grand slam put the Red Sox up 7–5. In the bottom of the inning, Roberto Alomar and Manny Ramirez hit back-to-back leadoff doubles off Derek Lowe before Thome's second home run of the game put the Indians back on top 8–7. The Red Sox, though, tied the game in the fourth on Valentin's sacrifice fly off Sean DePaula with the run charged to Nagy.

In the bottom of the fourth inning, Red Sox manager Jimy Williams opted to replace Derek Lowe with the ailing Pedro Martínez, who had left Game 1 with a back injury. This decision proved wise, as Pedro pitched spectacularly, throwing six hitless innings, striking out eight and walking three. Rookie reliever Sean DePaula, whom Hargrove had refused to use in Game 3 when it mattered and compromised his rotation as a result, matched Pedro for three innings and also holding the Red Sox hitless with two walks. Despite his mastery of the Sox, which since the middle of Game 3 had not been achieved by Cleveland pitchers, Hargrove removed him and opted to use inconsistent setup man Paul Shuey for the seventh inning. Shuey had won Game 1, but allowed two runs in the previous night's blowout loss in a 39-pitch effort. The Red Sox would then take the lead when Valentin hit an infield single and advanced to second on a Daubach groundout. the Indians then decided to intentionally walk Nomar Garciaparra, and then took the lead for good when the next batter, O'Leary, crushed a three-run home run on the first pitch he saw off Shuey. The Sox added another run in the ninth off Michael Jackson when Daubach and Garciaparra hit back-to-back one-out doubles to score pinch runner Donnie Sadler, who ran for Daubach. They won the game 12–8 to clinch the series, after the conclusion of which Mike Hargrove was dismissed as Cleveland manager.

With the win, the Red Sox won their first playoff series since the 1986 ALCS.

=== Composite box ===
1999 ALDS (3–2): Boston Red Sox over Cleveland Indians

Team	1	2	3	4	5	6	7	8	9	R	H	E
Boston Red Sox	4	6	9	7	5	1	12	2	1	47	56	3
Cleveland Indians	4	3	9	6	4	3	1	0	2	32	38	3
Total attendance: 202,917 Average attendance: 40,583

== See also ==
- 2007 American League Championship Series – a similar collapse by the Indians against the Red Sox
- 2016 World Series – a collapse by the Indians against the Cubs
- 2017 American League Division Series – another 0–2 collapse by the Indians, against the Yankees
