= Robert B. Miller College =

Coordinates: 42.333°N 85.179°W

The Robert B. Miller College was a private college in Battle Creek, Michigan, United States. It was housed in the Mawby Center of Kellogg Community College and closed in 2016.

== History ==
Founded in Battle Creek, Michigan, in 2005, the Robert B. Miller College was a private college named after Robert B. Miller Sr., former publisher of the Battle Creek Enquirer and philanthropist behind the Miller Foundation. As reported by MLive:

Miller, a private, nonprofit organization, was developed as a resource for working adult students, who are completing the last two years of their baccalaureate degrees. ... It is a collaboration between Kellogg Community College and Battle Creek-area foundation.

The college was described as aiming to train graduates to be skilled in their fields of study and to foster improvement in their local communities.

Miller College offered Bachelor of Arts and Bachelor of Science degrees in disciplines such as Business, Education, Nursing, and Liberal Arts. It had a student-to-faculty ratio of 16:1 and a modest student population of around 362.

== Closure ==
In 2015, auditors uncovered serious issues with the college's financial aid distribution, including improperly allocated funds totaling hundreds of thousands of dollars.

In June 2016, the college announced closure after auditors discovered large amounts of financial aid were being improperly distributed to students.

The Miller Foundation, which had invested approximately $10 million into the institution, deemed that an additional $5 to $7 million was required to keep the college afloat—a sum deemed unsustainable.

Paul Ohm, the former college president, described the situation as a "financial disaster".

== Aftermath ==
To ensure degree completion for students after the shutdown, the college partnered with Western Michigan University. Other students received transfer assistance to continue their education elsewhere.
