= Mike Reilly (umpire) =

American baseball umpire (born 1949)

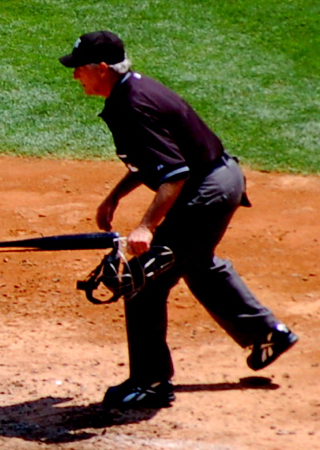
- Reilly in 2008
- Born: July 2, 1949 (age 77); Sioux City, Iowa, U.S.
- Occupation: Former MLB umpire
- Years active: 1977–2010

Michael Eugene Reilly (born July 2, 1949) is an American former Major League Baseball umpire who worked in the American League from 1977 to 1999 and throughout both major leagues from 2000 to 2010. Upon Ed Montague's retirement in February 2010, Reilly became Major League Baseball's senior umpire; his 4,362 career games ranked ninth in major league history entering the 2010 season. He retired on February 23, 2011, along with fellow umpires Jerry Crawford and Chuck Meriwether.

== Umpiring career ==
Reilly umpired in the World Series in 1984, 1992, 2002 and 2007, and in the All-Star Game in 1982, 1993, 2000, and 2010, calling balls and strikes for the last two contests. He also officiated in nine League Championship Series (1983, 1987, 1991, 1996, 1997, 2001, 2003, 2006, 2008) and six Division Series (1981, 1995, 1999, 2000, 2002, 2007). He also umpired in the 1976 Caribbean World Series.

Reilly wore the uniform number 31 after the American League adopted numbers in 1980. He continued to wear the number when umpires were combined into a single staff under the supervision of Major League Baseball in 2000.

Along with Steve Palermo, Reilly was one of the first American League umpires to never use the outside chest protector. Reilly and Palermo came to the junior circuit in 1977, the year the AL mandated all new umpires on staff would have to use the inside chest protector, which had been in use in the National League for decades. Umpires on staff prior to 1977 were grandfathered and could continue to wear the outside protector.

=== Notable games ===
Reilly was the third base umpire for David Wells' perfect game on May 17, 1998. He is famous for being on the October 26 cover of Sports Illustrated where he called Roberto Alomar of the Toronto Blue Jays out at home in Game 2 of the 1992 World Series when replay appeared to show Alomar as safe.

Reilly was the second base umpire for Mark Buehrle's no-hitter against the Texas Rangers on April 18, 2007.

== Personal life ==
Reilly received an associate degree from K.C.C. Junior College in 1970. He is a member of the board of directors for Big Brothers/Big Sisters and works with the Food Bank South Central Michigan. He was elected to St. Philip Catholic Central Hall of Fame in 1999 and is recognized by American Amateur Baseball as a consultant. He became interested in umpiring after taking a sports officiating class in college. His proudest moment as a major league umpire was working his first World Series (1984) in his home state. He coaches basketball at St. Philip/St. Joseph in the offseason and his hobbies include hunting, fishing, golfing and following the University of Notre Dame.

Reilly was raised and still resides in Battle Creek, Michigan, the breakfast cereal capital of the world (a fact which prompted longtime baseball broadcaster Ernie Harwell to nickname him "Corn Flakes Reilly").

Reilly's wife Mary graduated from the University of Michigan and is currently an elementary teacher. Together they have four children: Katie, Ryan, Patrick and Conor. Katie attended Michigan State and now lives in Florida. Ryan attended Albion College, and played baseball for the Britons. Patrick attends Western Michigan, and Conor recently graduated from St. Philip Catholic Central High School, where Mike Reilly graduated in 1968.

His nephew Brian Reilly is an umpire in the International League (AAA).

== See also ==
- List of Major League Baseball umpires (disambiguation)
