= St. Philip Catholic Central High School =

Location
- 20 Cherry Street; Battle Creek, Michigan 49017-3904; United States; 42°19′15″N 85°10′43″W

Information
- Type: Private, Coeducational
- Religious affiliation: Roman Catholic
- Established: 1863
- Grades: 9–12
- Enrollment: 115
- Colors: Red and white
- Fight song: "On Saint Philip"
- Athletics conference: Southern Central Athletic Association
- Nickname: Fighting Tigers
- Rival: Climax-Scotts High School
- Accreditation: Michigan Association of Non-Public Schools
- Website: bcacs.org/high-school/

St. Philip Catholic Central High School, located in the Roman Catholic Diocese of Kalamazoo, is a Roman Catholic high school in Battle Creek, Michigan.

== Sports ==
The Fighting Tigers compete in Division 4 of the MHSAA. Formerly the Tigers competed in the Class D division of the MHSAA. The Tigers are also members of the SCAA athletic conference. The school offers the following sports: baseball, boys' basketball, girls' basketball, boys' cross country, girls' cross country, football, boys' golf, boys' track, girls' track, volleyball, boys' and girls' swimming with Battle Creek Central, girls' soccer, and boys' soccer with Calhoun Christian.

St. Philip's is associated with the South Central Athletic Association (SCAA) beginning with the school year of (2009), transferring out of the Saint Joe Valley.

The most recent state Titles came in girls' cross country (2006), and volleyball (2007-W, 2007-F, 2008, 2009, 2010, 2011, 2012, 2013, 2014, 2020, 2021). St. Philip Volleyball has appeared in the state finals a record 31 times and has won the state championship a record 22 times.

The Interim Principal of St. Philip Catholic Central High School is Danielle Cook.

== Notable alumni ==
- Don Kent, professional wrestler
- Mike Reilly, Major League Baseball umpire
- John C. Sheehan, organic chemist
