= Battle Creek, Michigan =

- City
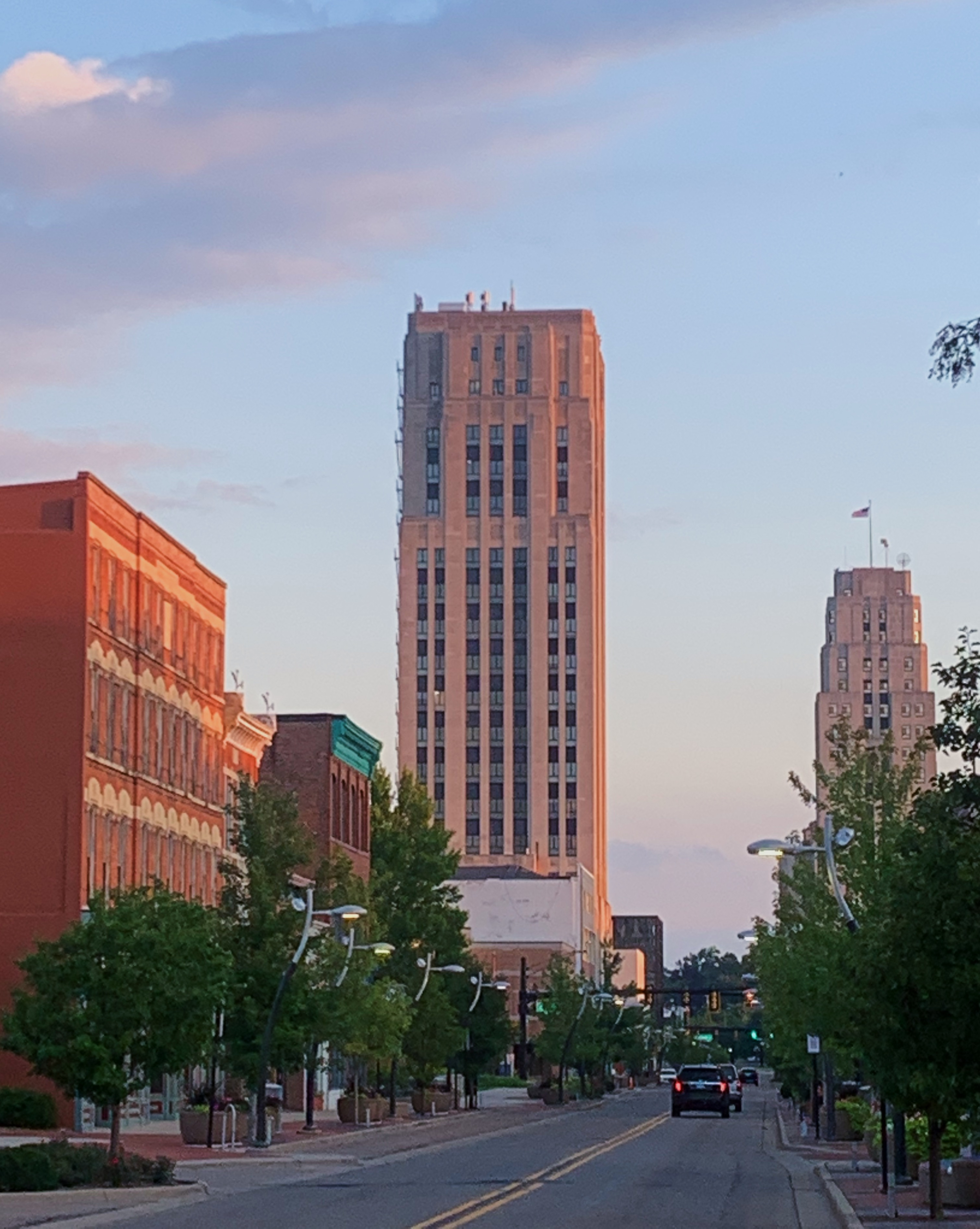
- View of Downtown Battle Creek

- Flag Seal
- Nickname: "Cereal City"
- Location of Battle Creek within Michigan

- Location within Michigan Location within the United States
- Coordinates: 42°18′44″N 85°12′15″W
- Country: United States
- State: Michigan
- County: Calhoun
- Settled: 1831
- Incorporated: 1840 (village); 1859 (city)
- Founder: Sands McCamly
- Named for: Battle Creek River

Government
  - Type: Council-Manager
  - Mayor: Mark Behnke
  - City Manager: Rebecca Fleury

Area
  - Total: 43.73 sq mi (113.27 km^{2})
  - Land: 42.59 sq mi (110.30 km^{2})
  - Water: 1.15 sq mi (2.97 km^{2})
- Elevation: 840 ft (256 m)

Population (2020)
  - Total: 52,721
  - Density: 1,238.0/sq mi (477.98/km^{2})
- Demonym: Battlecreekite
- Time zone: UTC−5 (Eastern)
  - Summer (DST): UTC−4 (Eastern)
- ZIP Codes: 49014–49018, 49037
- Area code: 269
- FIPS code: 26-05920
- GNIS feature ID: 0620755
- Website: www.battlecreekmi.gov

Battle Creek is a city in northwestern Calhoun County, Michigan, United States. It sits at the confluence of the Kalamazoo and Battle Creek rivers. As of the 2020 census, the city had a total population of 52,731. It is the principal city of the Battle Creek metropolitan statistical area, which encompasses all of Calhoun County. Nicknamed "Cereal City", it is best known as the home of WK Kellogg Co and the founding city of Post Consumer Brands.

== Toponym ==
One local legend says Battle Creek was named after an encounter between a federal government land survey party led by Colonel John Mullett and two Potawatomi in March 1824. The two Potawatomi had approached the camp asking for food because they were hungry as the U.S. Army was late delivering supplies promised to them under the 1821 Treaty of Chicago. After a protracted discussion, the Native Americans allegedly tried to take food. One of the surveyors shot and seriously wounded one Potawatomi. Following the encounter, the survey party retreated to Detroit. Early white settlers called the nearby stream Battle Creek River and the town took its name from that.

Another folk etymology is attributed to the local river, which was known as Waupakisco by Native Americans. The Waupakisco or Waupokisco was supposedly a reference to a battle or fight fought between indigenous tribes before the arrival of Europeans. However, Virgil J. Vogel, Professor Emeritus of history and social science at Harry S. Truman College in Chicago, believes the native name has "nothing to do with blood or battle".

== History ==
In about 1774, the Potawatomi and the Ottawa Native American tribes formed a joint village near the future Battle Creek, Michigan. The first permanent European settlements in Battle Creek Township, after the removal of the Potawatomi to a reservation, began about 1831. Westward migration from New York and New England had increased to Michigan following the completion of the Erie Canal in New York in 1824. Most settlers chose to locate on the Goguac prairie, which was fertile and easily cultivated. A post office was opened in Battle Creek in 1832 under Postmaster Pollodore Hudson. The first school was taught in a small log house about 1833 or 1834. Asa Langley and several workers (Adrian Godbey, Jackson Morgan, Ethan baker, etc.) built the first sawmill in 1837. A brick manufacturing plant, called the oldest enterprise in the township, was established in 1840 by Simon Carr and operated until 1903. The township was established by act of the legislature in 1839.

In the antebellum era, the city was a major stop on the Underground Railroad, used by fugitive slaves to escape to freedom in Michigan and Canada. It was the chosen home of noted abolitionist Sojourner Truth after her escape from slavery.

Battle Creek figured prominently in the early history of the Seventh-day Adventist Church. It was the site of a Protestant church founding convention in 1863. The denomination's first hospital, college, and publishing office would also be constructed in the city. When the hospital and publishing office burned down in 1902, the church elected to decentralize, and most of its institutions were relocated. The first Adventist church (rebuilt in the 1920s) is still in operation.

World Heavyweight Champion Jack Johnson was once arrested here for marrying his White wife and transporting her across state lines. He was detained in Battle Creek, where he visited a former acquaintance, went for a sleigh ride and spent the night at the house of patrolman John Patterson, Battle Creek's first African American police officer. Federal authorities from Chicago took him into custody the next day.

The city was noted for its focus on health reform during the late 1800s and early 1900s. The Battle Creek Sanitarium was founded by the Seventh-day Adventist Church and Dr. John Harvey Kellogg. In addition to some of his sometimes bizarre treatments that were featured in the movie The Road to Wellville, Kellogg also funded organizations that promoted eugenics theories at the core of their philosophical agenda, which was seen as a natural complement to euthenics. The Race Betterment Foundation was one of these organizations. He also supported the "separate but equal" philosophy and invited Booker T. Washington to speak at the Battle Creek Sanitarium in order to raise money. Washington was the author of the speech "The Atlanta Compromise", which solidified his position of being an accommodationist while providing a mechanism for southern Whites (and their sympathizers), to fund his school (the Tuskegee Institute).

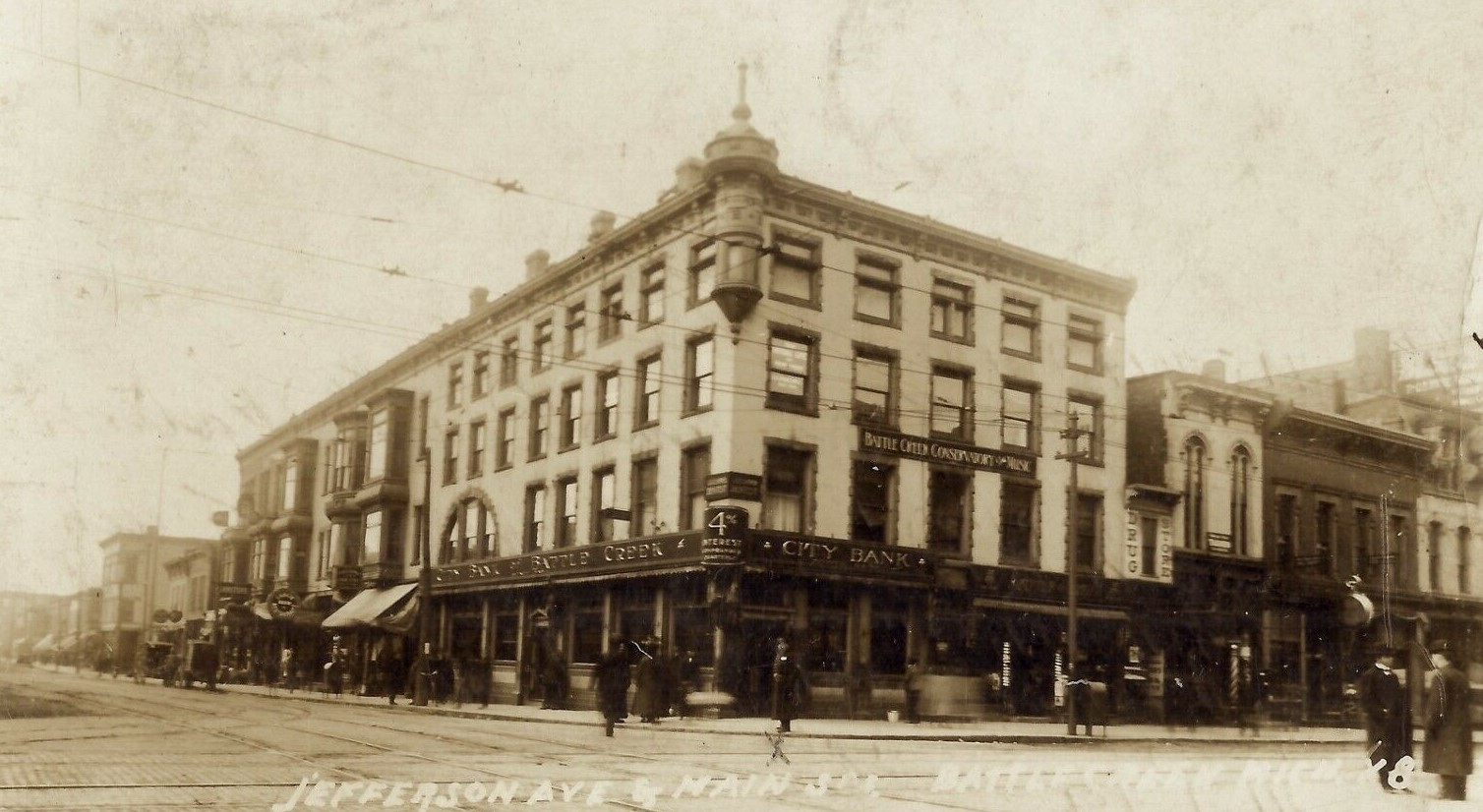
City Bank of Battle Creek was shown on a real photo postcard sent on July 7, 1908

W. K. Kellogg had worked for his brother in a variety of capacities at the B.C. Sanitarium. Tired of living in the shadow of his brother John Harvey Kellogg, he struck out on his own, going to the boom-towns surrounding the oilfields in Oklahoma as a broom salesman. Having failed, he returned to work as an assistant to his brother. While working at the sanitariums' laboratory, W. K. spilled liquefied cornmeal on a heating device that cooked the product and rendered it to flakes. He tasted the flakes and added milk to them. He was able to get his brother to allow him to give some of the product to some of the patients at the sanitarium, and the patients' demand for the product exceeded his expectations to the point that W. K. made the decision to leave the sanitarium. Along with some investors, he built a factory to satisfy the demand for his "corn flakes".

It was during this time of going their separate ways for good that Dr. John Harvey Kellogg sued his brother for copyright infringement. The U.S. Supreme court ruled in W. K. Kellogg's favor, due to the greater sales and public profile of W. K. Kellogg's company.

Inspired by Kellogg's innovation, C. W. Post invented Grape-Nuts and founded his own cereal company in the town. Battle Creek has been nicknamed "the Cereal City."

In the turbulent 1960s, Battle Creek was not immune to the racial issues of the day. Dr. Martin Luther King spoke here, as did Sen. Hubert Humphrey, President Lyndon B. Johnson, and Heavyweight Champion of the world Muhammad Ali. African Americans were subjected to "stop and frisk" procedures while walking, and housing covenants were in full force. No Blacks worked in the school systems, and only a few Blacks held mid-level manager posts in the local corporate sector. The Federal government sector was better at the Federal Center, and less so at the local Veterans' Administration Hospital.

== Geography ==
According to the United States Census Bureau, the city has a total area of 43.73 square miles (113.26 km^{2}), of which 42.61 square miles (110.36 km^{2}) is land and 1.12 square miles (2.90 km^{2}) is water, making Battle Creek the third largest city in Michigan by area, and one of only three incorporated municipalities in the state over 40 sq mi (100 km^{2}) in size.

- Approximately 60% of the city's land is developed. Of the undeveloped land, 38% is zoned agricultural, 26% is zoned general industrial, 17.5% is zoned residential, 16% is the Fort Custer Army National Guard Base/Industrial Park, and 2.5% is zone commercial.
- After Battle Creek Township merged into the city of Battle Creek in 1983, the city's declining population rose by nearly 18,000 new residents. Prior to the merge, the city measured 18.6 square miles (48.17 km^{2}).
- Battle Creek is variously considered to be part of West Michigan or Southern Michigan.

=== Climate ===
Climate data for Battle Creek, Michigan (1991–2020 normals, extremes 1895–present)
Month	Jan	Feb	Mar	Apr	May	Jun	Jul	Aug	Sep	Oct	Nov	Dec	Year
Record high °F (°C)	68 (20)	70 (21)	84 (29)	90 (32)	95 (35)	101 (38)	104 (40)	103 (39)	99 (37)	91 (33)	80 (27)	68 (20)	104 (40)
Mean daily maximum °F (°C)	32.4 (0.2)	35.7 (2.1)	46.7 (8.2)	60.0 (15.6)	71.5 (21.9)	79.9 (26.6)	83.1 (28.4)	81.3 (27.4)	74.4 (23.6)	61.7 (16.5)	48.2 (9.0)	36.8 (2.7)	59.3 (15.2)
Daily mean °F (°C)	24.8 (−4.0)	26.9 (−2.8)	36.7 (2.6)	48.4 (9.1)	59.7 (15.4)	68.3 (20.2)	71.5 (21.9)	69.9 (21.1)	62.9 (17.2)	51.7 (10.9)	39.9 (4.4)	29.7 (−1.3)	49.2 (9.6)
Mean daily minimum °F (°C)	17.2 (−8.2)	18.1 (−7.7)	26.6 (−3.0)	36.9 (2.7)	47.9 (8.8)	56.8 (13.8)	59.9 (15.5)	58.4 (14.7)	51.3 (10.7)	41.7 (5.4)	31.6 (−0.2)	22.6 (−5.2)	39.1 (3.9)
Record low °F (°C)	−21 (−29)	−24 (−31)	−11 (−24)	5 (−15)	22 (−6)	30 (−1)	42 (6)	37 (3)	25 (−4)	16 (−9)	−6 (−21)	−18 (−28)	−24 (−31)
Average precipitation inches (mm)	2.09 (53)	1.58 (40)	1.90 (48)	3.23 (82)	3.95 (100)	3.67 (93)	3.38 (86)	3.52 (89)	3.07 (78)	3.66 (93)	2.55 (65)	1.84 (47)	34.44 (875)
Average snowfall inches (cm)	18.1 (46)	15.6 (40)	6.0 (15)	2.1 (5.3)	0.0 (0.0)	0.0 (0.0)	0.0 (0.0)	0.0 (0.0)	0.0 (0.0)	0.5 (1.3)	5.9 (15)	16.4 (42)	64.6 (164)
Average precipitation days (≥ 0.01 in)	14.0	10.8	9.7	12.4	13.0	11.1	9.3	10.2	9.9	12.9	10.8	13.5	137.6
Average snowy days (≥ 0.1 in)	12.8	10.3	5.0	1.9	0.0	0.0	0.0	0.0	0.0	0.3	4.3	10.6	45.2
Source: NOAA

=== Nearby municipalities ===
- Bedford Charter Township
- Emmett Charter Township
- Pennfield Charter Township
- City of Springfield
- Urbandale

== Demographics ==
Battle Creek, Michigan – Racial and ethnic composition Note: the US Census treats Hispanic/Latino as an ethnic category. This table excludes Latinos from the racial categories and assigns them to a separate category. Hispanics/Latinos may be of any race.
Race / Ethnicity (NH = Non-Hispanic)	Pop 2000	Pop 2010	Pop 2020	% 2000	% 2010	% 2020
White alone (NH)	38,761	35,911	32,621	72.64%	68.60%	61.87%
Black or African American alone (NH)	9,440	9,347	9,306	17.69%	17.86%	17.65%
Native American or Alaska Native alone (NH)	360	292	284	0.67%	0.56%	0.54%
Asian alone (NH)	1,024	1,254	2,670	1.92%	2.40%	5.06%
Native Hawaiian or Pacific Islander alone (NH)	6	15	12	0.01%	0.03%	0.02%
Other race alone (NH)	70	81	286	0.13%	0.16%	0.54%
Mixed race or Multiracial (NH)	1,228	1,930	3,479	2.30%	3.69%	6.60%
Hispanic or Latino (any race)	2,475	3,517	4,063	4.64%	6.72%	7.71%
Total	53,364	52,347	52,721	100.00%	100.00%	100.00%

Historical population
Census	Pop.	Note	%±
1840	993		—
1850	1,064		7.2%
1860	3,509		229.8%
1870	5,838		66.4%
1880	7,063		21.0%
1890	13,197		86.8%
1900	18,563		40.7%
1910	25,267		36.1%
1920	36,164		43.1%
1930	45,573		26.0%
1940	43,453		−4.7%
1950	48,666		12.0%
1960	44,169		−9.2%
1970	38,931		−11.9%
1980	35,724		−8.2%
1990	53,540		49.9%
2000	53,364		−0.3%
2010	52,347		−1.9%
2020	52,721		0.7%
U.S. Decennial Census

In 1982, at the insistence of Kellogg's, the city annexed Battle Creek Township, nearly doubling the city's population. Kellogg's even went so far as to threaten to move their headquarters if the annexation failed to occur.

=== 2020 census ===
Nick Buckley wrote in the Battle Creek Enquirer: "The 2020 Census is critical for Battle Creek. Falling below the 50,000-resident threshold would mean a change from "urbanized area" to "urban cluster" and a loss of federal entitlement funding."

As of the 2020 census, Battle Creek had a population of 52,721. The median age was 37.8 years. 24.6% of residents were under the age of 18 and 16.3% of residents were 65 years of age or older. For every 100 females there were 94.6 males, and for every 100 females age 18 and over there were 91.2 males age 18 and over.

98.0% of residents lived in urban areas, while 2.0% lived in rural areas.

There were 21,466 households in Battle Creek, of which 29.8% had children under the age of 18 living in them. Of all households, 35.0% were married-couple households, 21.6% were households with a male householder and no spouse or partner present, and 34.5% were households with a female householder and no spouse or partner present. About 34.2% of all households were made up of individuals and 13.9% had someone living alone who was 65 years of age or older.

There were 23,515 housing units, of which 8.7% were vacant. The homeowner vacancy rate was 1.8% and the rental vacancy rate was 9.3%.

Racial composition as of the 2020 census
Race	Number	Percent
White	33,648	63.8%
Black or African American	9,423	17.9%
American Indian and Alaska Native	409	0.8%
Asian	2,681	5.1%
Native Hawaiian and Other Pacific Islander	14	0.0%
Some other race	1,880	3.6%
Two or more races	4,666	8.9%

=== 2010 census ===
As of the census of 2010, there were 52,347 people, 21,118 households, and 12,898 families residing in the city. The population density was 1,228.5 inhabitants per square mile (474.3/km^{2}). There were 24,277 housing units at an average density of 569.7 per square mile (220.0/km^{2}). The racial makeup of the city was 71.7% White, 18.2% African American, 0.7% Native American, 2.4% Asian, 2.7% from other races, and 4.3% from two or more races. Hispanic or Latino people of any race were 6.7% of the population.

In the 21,118 households 33.6% had children under the age of 18 living with them, 37.1% were married couples living together, 18.5% had a female householder with no husband present, 5.5% had a male householder with no wife present, and 38.9% were non-families. 32.6% of all households were made up of individuals, and 12.1% had someone living alone who was 65 years of age or older. The average household size was 2.41 and the average family size was 3.04.

The median age in the city was 36.3 years. 26.1% of residents were under the age of 18; 9% were between the ages of 18 and 24; 25.9% were from 25 to 44; 25.5% were from 45 to 64; and 13.4% were 65 years of age or older. The gender makeup of the city was 47.9% male and 52.1% female.

As of April 2013, Battle Creek had the fifth largest Japanese national population in the state of Michigan, with 358.

=== 2000 census ===
As of the census of 2000, there were 53,364 people, 21,348 households, and 13,363 families residing in the city. The population density was 1,246.0 inhabitants per square mile (481.1/km^{2}). There were 23,525 housing units at an average density of 549.3 per square mile (212.1/km^{2}). The racial makeup of the city was 74.7% White, 17.8% Black or African American, 1.9% Asian, 0.8% Native American, <0.1% Pacific Islander, 2.1% from other races, and 2.7% from two or more races. 4.6% of the population were Hispanic or Latino of any race.

In the 21,348 households 32.3% had children under the age of 18 living with them, 41.9% were married couples living together, 16.1% had a female householder with no husband present, and 37.4% were non-families. 31.6% of all households were made up of individuals, and 12.1% had someone living alone who was 65 years of age or older. The average household size was 2.43 and the average family size was 3.04.

In the city, 27.2% of the population was under the age of 18, 8.7% from 18 to 24, 29.5% from 25 to 44, 21.0% from 45 to 64, and 13.5% who were 65 years of age or older. The median age was 35 years. For every 100 females, there were 91.9 males. For every 100 females age 18 and over, there were 87.2 males.

The median income for a household in the city was $35,491, and the median income for a family was $43,564. Males had a median income of $36,838 versus $26,429 for females. The per capita income for the city was $18,424. About 10.7% of families and 14.4% of the population were below the poverty line, including 17.5% of those under age 18 and 11.8% of those age 65 or over.

== Government ==
The City of Battle Creek has a commission-manager form of government. Cities that follow this plan of government have an elected commission (or council) that appoints a professionally trained and experienced manager to administer the day-to-day operations of the city and to make recommendations to the city commission. Battle Creek also appoints a City Attorney, who provides legal counsel to the city manager and City Commission.

The City Commission makes all policy decisions, including review, revision, and final approval of the annual budget, which is proposed annually by the City Manager. The City Manager serves as an "at-will" employee and they work under an employment contract with the commission. All other city employees, except for the City Attorney's staff, are under the supervision of the City Manager.

There are five ward commissioners. Residents cast votes for a ward representative, who must live within the area they are representing, as well as for four at-large commissioners. These candidates may live anywhere in the city. All commissioners serve two-year terms and all terms begin and end at the same election.

The position of mayor was voted on by the electorate until 1961, then was switched to the elected commissioners choosing from amongst themselves as to who would serve as the mayor and vice mayor for the next year. In March 2020, a majority of Battle Creek voters approved an amendment to the city charter to allow residents to directly vote for the mayor; the first general election for mayor, since 1961, was held in November 2020. The mayor presides over the commission meetings and appoints commissioners and residents to special committees. He may also form special committees to explore community challenges or potential policies. The vice mayor stands in if the mayor is unavailable.

As of 2017, the city levies an income tax of 1 percent on residents and 0.5 percent on nonresidents.

== Economy ==
=== Largest employers ===
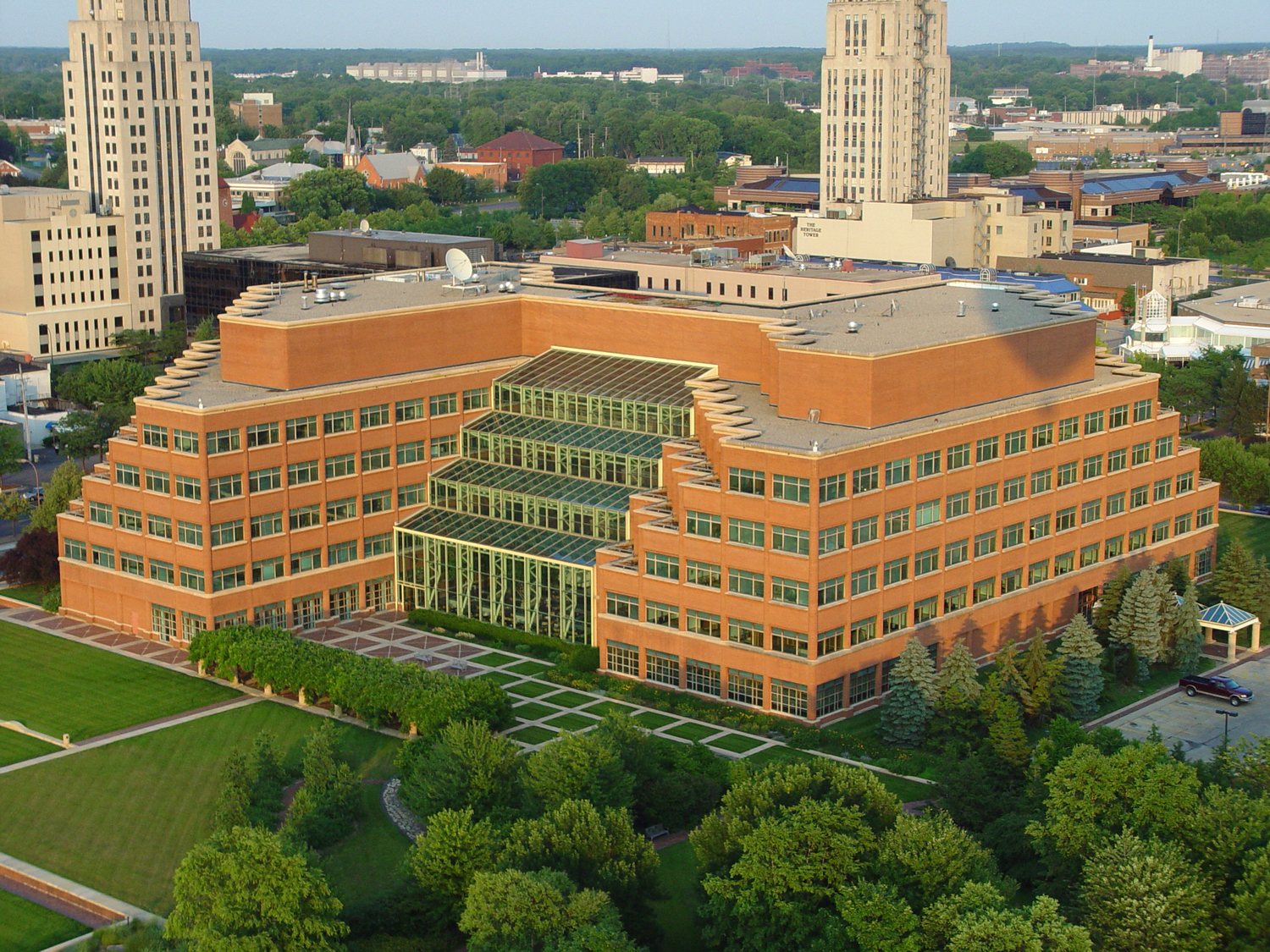
Battle Creek is known for the World Headquarters of Kellogg's, best known for its Kellogg's Corn Flakes and Special K cereals.

As of October 2023, according to a Battle Creek Unlimited report, the twenty largest employers in the city are:

Employer	Industry	Staff
Denso Manufacturing Michigan, Inc.	Auto parts	2,500
WK Kellogg Co (Note: This list was published October 1, 2023, with Kellogg Company (Kellogg's) ranked at #2 with 2,000 employees. The Kellogg Company split into two companies on October 2, 2023. The North American cereal division became its own company, WK Kellogg Co, headquartered in Battle Creek. The number of Battle Creek-based employees attributed to WK Kellogg Co may or may not have changed on October 2, 2003; thus, this entry may actually include some number of employees that technically belong to Kellanova, the second new company formed on October 2, 2023.)	Foods	2,000
FireKeepers Casino Hotel	Casino	1,730
Veterans Administration Medical Center	Medical services	1,670
Hart–Dole–Inouye Federal Center	Government	1,500
Bronson Battle Creek	Medical services	1,360
Fort Custer Training Center	Government	825
Duncan Aviation, Inc.	Aircraft refurbishing	761
Kellogg Community College	Education	709
Michigan Air National Guard	Government	650
TRMI	Electronics	617
Calhoun County	Government	614
II Stanley Company, Inc.	Lights and equipment	609
Post Consumer Brands	Foods	600
City of Battle Creek	Government	532
Magna Cosma Castings	Auto parts	450
Battle Creek Public Schools	Education	433
Musashi Auto Parts, Inc.	Auto parts	425
Lakeview School District	Education	395
Adient	Auto parts	334

== Education ==
=== Colleges and universities ===
- Kellogg Community College, a two-year college founded in 1956
- Robert B. Miller College, a four-year institution which shared KCC's facilities. The college closed in 2016.
- Western Michigan University's Battle Creek Branch — The Kendall Center
- Western Michigan University's College of Aviation, located at W. K. Kellogg Airport
- Spring Arbor University Battle Creek Branch
- Davenport University Battle Creek Campus. This campus of the college closed in 2015.
- Central Michigan University, Battle Creek Campus on Air National Guard Base, W. K. Kellogg Airport

=== Public school districts ===
The following school districts include portions of the city limits:

- Battle Creek Public Schools
- Lakeview School District
- Climax-Scotts Community School District
- Pennfield School District
- Harper Creek Community Schools

==== High schools (public) ====
- Battle Creek Central High School
- Harper Creek High School
- Battle Creek Area Learning Center, better known as Calhoun Community High School
- Lakeview High School, including Lakeview High School Library, a 2008 American Library Association award recipient
- Michigan Youth Challenge Academy
- Pennfield Senior High School

==== High schools (private) ====
- Battle Creek Academy
- Bedford Bible Church School
- Calhoun Christian School
- St. Philip Catholic Central High School

==== Secondary schools ====
- Battle Creek Area Mathematics and Science Center, an accelerated secondary school that focuses primarily on STEM education The Battle Creek Area Mathematics and Science Center is attended by underclassmen in the mornings and upperclassmen in the afternoons.
- Calhoun Area Career Center, provides career and technical education to primarily 11th and 12th grade students

=== Foreign-language education ===
The Battle Creek Japanese School (バトルクリーク補習授業校 Batoru Kurīku Hoshū Jugyō Kō), a supplementary weekend Japanese school, holds its classes at the Lakeview School District building.

In 1980 the Western Michigan University Center for International Programs developed a program for Japanese expatriate K-12 students that was sponsored by Battle Creek Unlimited (BCU); the classes were held in the company facility at Fort Custer Industrial Park.

== Culture ==
=== Print media ===
- The local daily newspapers are The Battle Creek Shopper and the newspaper of record is the Battle Creek Enquirer, owned and operated by Gannett.

=== Radio ===
FM radio stations that originate or can be heard over the air in Battle Creek:

- WSPB 89.7 - Battle Creek - Holy Family Radio Roman Catholic Radio
- WCFG 90.9 - Springfield - Christian Adult Contemporary (WCSG)
- WCSG 91.3 - Grand Rapids - Christian Adult Contemporary
- WMJC 91.9 - Richland - Religious (Strong Tower Radio)
- W222BB 92.3 - Battle Creek - Christian (WJKN 89.3)
- WZUU 92.5 - Mattawan/Kalamazoo - Classic Rock
- WGPG-LP 92.9 - Battle Creek - Religious
- WBCT 93.7 - Grand Rapids - Country
- WWDK 94.1 - Jackson/Lansing/Battle Creek/Kalamazoo - Classic Country
- WBCK 95.3 - Battle Creek - News/Talk
- W242BH 96.3 - Marshall - Contemporary Christian (Smile FM)
- WTOU 96.5 - Portage/Kalamazoo - Urban Contemporary
- WNWN 98.5 - Coldwater/Battle Creek/Kalamazoo - Country
- WFPM-LP 99.5 - Battle Creek - Gospel
- WBCH-FM 100.1 - Hastings - Country
- W266CG 101.1 - Battle Creek - Christian (FM translator for AM 1400)
- W274AQ 102.7 - Battle Creek - Classic Hits (FM translator for AM 930)
- WKFR 103.3 - Battle Creek/Kalamazoo - CHR/Top 40
- WBXX 104.9 - Marshall/Battle Creek - Urban Contemporary
- WSRW 105.7 - Grand Rapids - Adult Contemporary
- WJXQ 106.1 - Jackson/Lansing/Battle Creek - Mainstream Rock
- WVFM 106.5 - Kalamazoo - Adult Hits (Jack FM)
- WRKR 107.7 - Portage/Battle Creek/Kalamazoo - Classic Rock

AM radio stations that originate or can be heard over the air in Battle Creek:

- WKZO 590 - Kalamazoo - News/Talk - (FM translator at 106.9)
- WFAT 930 - Battle Creek - Classic Hits
- WILS 1320 - Lansing - News/Talk
- WKMI 1360 - Kalamazoo - News/Talk
- WBFN 1400 - Battle Creek - Christian
- WQLR 1660 - Kalamazoo - Sports

==== Television ====
- WWMT, a CBS affiliate licensed to Kalamazoo and also serving Battle Creek, Grand Rapids and western Michigan
- WOOD-TV, an NBC affiliate licensed to Grand Rapids and the default NBC station for Battle Creek.
- WOTV, an ABC/CW affiliate serving Battle Creek, Kalamazoo, and southwestern Michigan, and also serving as a secondary ABC affiliate (alongside WZZM) for Grand Rapids
- WXMI, the FOX affiliate from Grand Rapids.
- WZPX, an ION affiliate serving all of western Michigan
- WLLA, an independent station largely broadcasting religious programming from Kalamazoo.
- WGVU, the PBS member station from Grand Rapids but broadcasting from a satellite broadcaster in Kalamazoo.
- AccessVision, public-access television on Comcast channels 16 and 17; broadcasts to all municipalities within Battle Creek, and Newton Township

=== Festivals ===
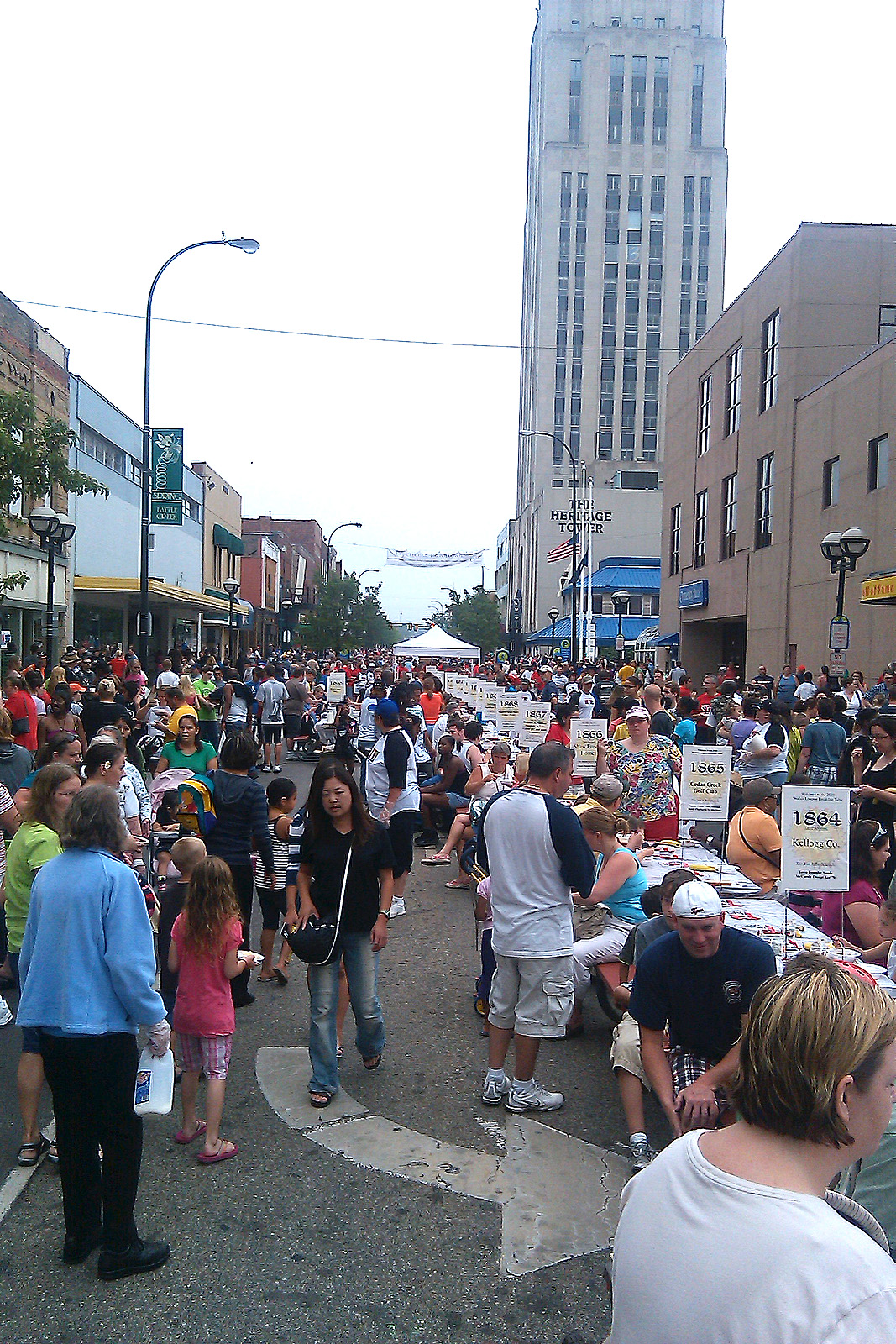
2010 World's Longest Breakfast Table

- The World's Longest Breakfast Table
- The Battle Creek Field of Flight Entertainment Festival is an air show and balloon event held yearly in Battle Creek.
- International Festival of Lights

=== Music ===
Battle Creek is home to the Music Center, which serves South Central Michigan.

The Battle Creek Symphony Orchestra is based at the W. K. Kellogg Auditorium in downtown Battle Creek. The symphony is conducted by Anne Harrigan. It is Michigan's longest-running symphony orchestra.

The Brass Band of Battle Creek is composed of 31 brass players and percussionists from around the United States and Europe. "Created in 1989 by brothers Jim and Bill Gray, podiatrists and amateur brass players from Battle Creek, MI, the BBBC has grown to cult status in Battle Creek, where BBBC concerts are regularly sold out and waiting lists are created weeks in advance." The Brass Band of Battle Creek's Christmas concerts features many different songs ranging from modern hits to classical Christmas songs.

Leilapalooza - The Leila Arboretum Music Festival is a free summer music festival held at the Leila Arboretum. Proceeds benefit the Leila Arboretum Society and Kingman Museum.

=== Sports ===
Battle Creek hosts the annual Michigan High School Athletic Association team wrestling, volleyball, baseball, and softball state championships. The town receives quarterly boosts to its economy from the fans who flock there to follow their teams.

Each year, Battle Creek hosts the Sandy Koufax 13S World Series, for 13-year-old baseball players.

In August 2010, Battle Creek was host to the eighth edition of the International H.K.D. Games.

In June 2024, the mens 4 × 800 m relay team from Saint Philip Catholic Central High School took third place at the MHSAA Track and Field State Championship.

==== Sports teams ====
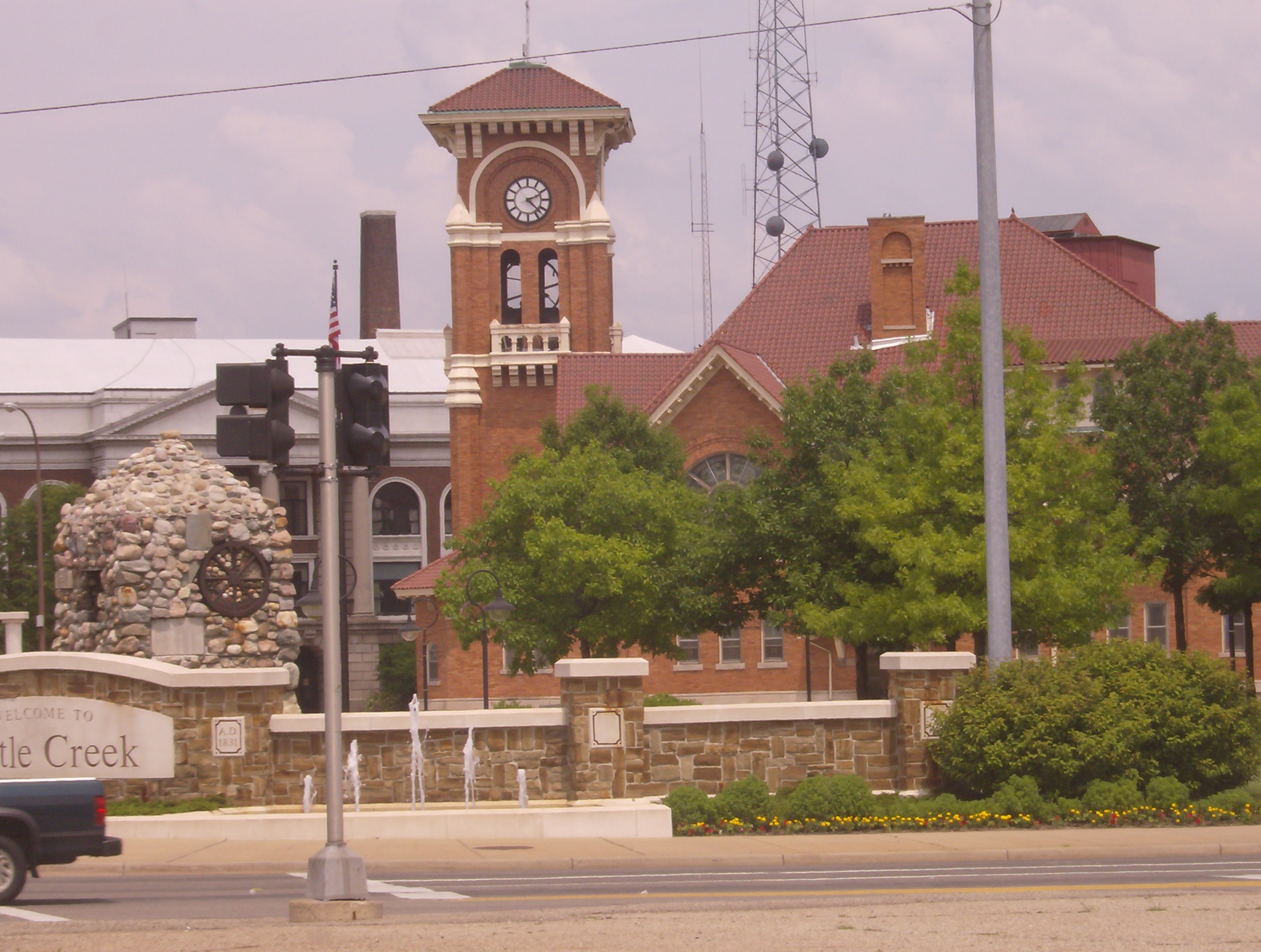
Downtown Battle Creek

The Battle Creek Battle Jacks (formerly Bombers) are a collegiate baseball team, a member of the Northwoods League, who began play in 2007. After a last-place finish in 2010, the Bombers went 47–26 in 2011 and won their first NWL championship. It was the first championship in Battle Creek since 2000, when the Michigan Battle Cats won the Midwest League championship. The team's home is C.O. Brown Stadium. In 2011, the team signed a five-year lease, which guarantees the team's ten-year anniversary in Battle Creek in 2017. Actor Tyler Hoechlin, who starred alongside Tom Hanks in the critically acclaimed film Road to Perdition, previously played for the Battle Creek Bombers.

Club	Sport	League	Venue
Battle Creek Battle Jacks	Baseball	Summer Collegiate Baseball, Northwoods League	C. O. Brown Stadium

==== Former sports teams ====
The Michigan Battle Cats/Battle Creek Yankees/Southwest Michigan Devil Rays were a Class A minor league baseball team that played in the Midwest League from 1995 through 2006. The team's home was C.O. Brown Stadium.

The Battle Creek Crunch were a member of the Great Lakes Indoor Football League (GLIFL), that began play in 2006. They played one season in Battle Creek before ceasing operations due to financial trouble. The team's home was Kellogg Arena.

The Battle Creek Belles, a member of the All-American Girls Professional Baseball League, played two seasons, 1951 and 1952, before relocating to Muskegon.

The Battle Creek Revolution were a member of the All American Hockey League, a low-level professional minor league, from 2008 to 2011. The team's home was Revolution Arena. The organization also started a junior hockey team called the Battle Creek Jr. Revolution in 2010. The junior team was sold renamed to the West Michigan Wolves in 2014 before relocating to Lansing in 2017.

The Battle Creek Blaze is a not-for-profit, adult football team that plays NFL rules football as a member of the IFL (Interstate Football League). The Blaze organization raises funds and community awareness in the fight against cancer. They are in their sixth season of operation, and won the IFL North Division Championship in 2010.

The Battle Creek Cereal Killers roller derby team began in 2011.

The Battle Creek Knights are a minor league basketball team. They were a charter member of the International Basketball League (IBL) and went 21-0 during the league's first season in 2005, winning the championship. The team's home is Kellogg Arena. After announcing in July 2009 that they would sit out the 2009 season, that October the team announced that they would return to play in the International Basketball League.

In June 2019, the Federal Prospects Hockey League (FPHL) announced it had added a tenth team for the 2019–20 season and it would be in Michigan. On July 23, the Battle Creek Rumble Bees were announced with Adam Stio as the general manager after previously serving in the same role with the Southern Professional Hockey League's Evansville Thunderbolts. The FHL had played multiple neutral site games in Battle Creek over the previous seasons before placing an expansion team there. The Rumble Bees hired Clint Hagmaier as their first head coach, however, he was released after a 0–9 start to the season with Stio taking over as interim head coach. The Rumble Bees had a 1–45–0–2 record when the league's 2019–20 season was cancelled due to the coronavirus pandemic. Their losing streak led to them being named "the worst team in professional hockey". After the season, the team's players went to different teams in the FPHL as part of a dispersal draft.

Disc Golf

Battle Creek is home to 9 disc golf courses.

== Points of interest ==
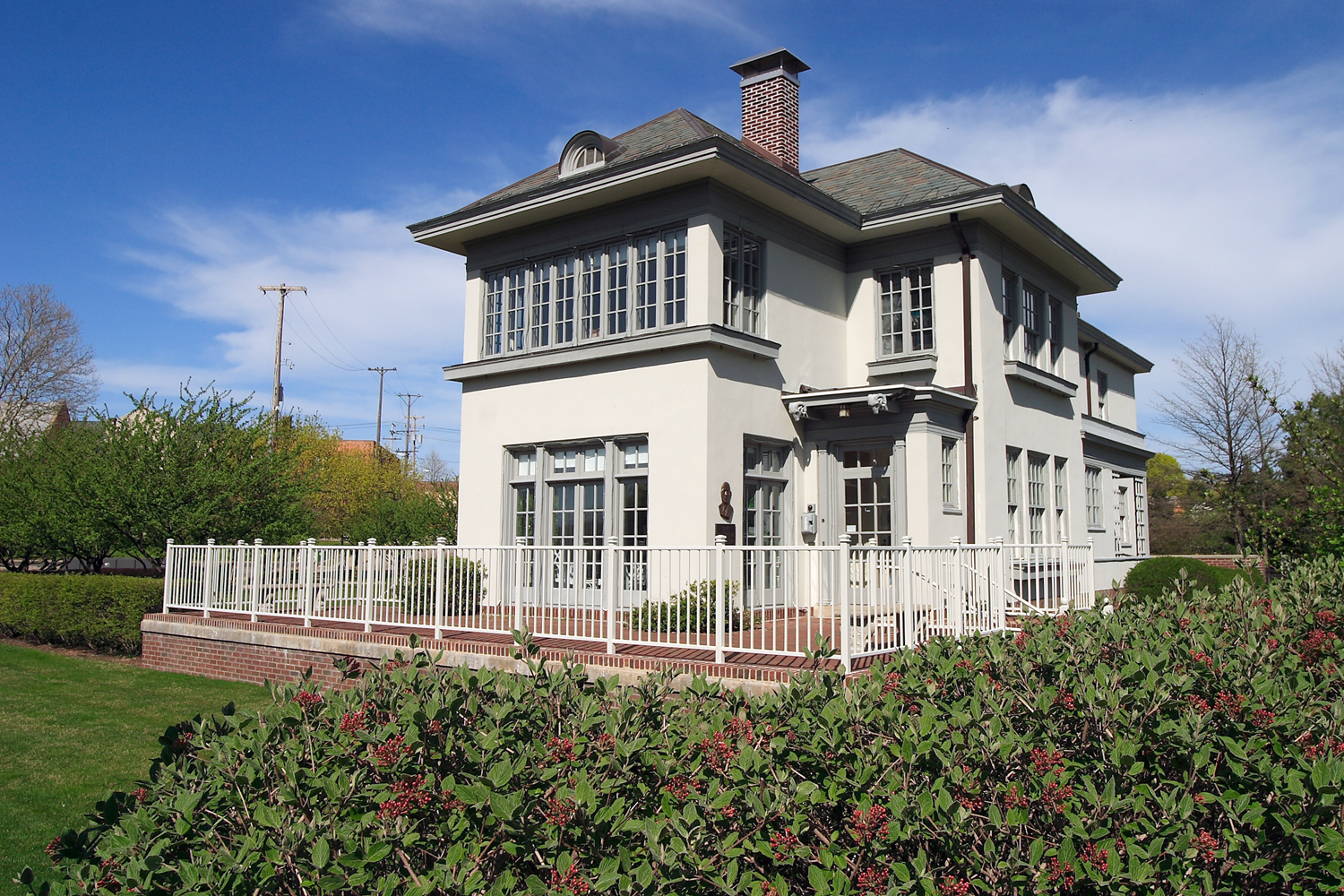
Kellogg House

- Art Center of Battle Creek
- Bailey Park & C.O. Brown Stadium
- Battle Creek Sanitarium (now the Hart–Dole–Inouye Federal Center)
- Battle Creek Tabernacle (Seventh-day Adventist Church)
- Binder Park Zoo
- Fort Custer Recreation Area
- Historic Adventist Village
- Kimball House Museum
- Kiwanis Outdoor Center
- Battle Creek Regional History Museum
- Kingman Museum and Planetarium
- Leila Arboretum
- Linear Park
- Willard Beach and Park
- Willard Library
- Saint Philip Roman Catholic Church
- Springfield Burma Center
- Battle Creek Country Club
- Historic Bridge Park
- Ott Preserve

=== Fort Custer Army National Guard Base ===
Founded in 1917, Camp Custer, as it was then known, served over the next decades as a training ground, from World War I until the present. Parts of the base were spun off and developed as the Battle Creek Veteran's Hospital, Fort Custer National Cemetery, Fort Custer Recreation Area and Fort Custer Industrial Park. This industrial park contains more than 90 different companies.

The United States Government still owns the land, under an arrangement by which the state of Michigan administers and manages the property. The base, which is still mostly undeveloped, wooded land, takes up a sizable portion of Battle Creek's land area. The part of the base in Battle Creek that is now the industrial park measures 4.69 square miles (12.15 km^{2}) in area, which is approximately 10.6% of the city's area. A much larger part of the base lies in Kalamazoo County. The adjoining W. K. Kellogg Airport is a joint civilian-Air National Guard facility. Battle Creek is also home to Fort Custer Recreation Park, a state park located in the Battle Creek-Springfield Area.

== Transportation ==
Battle Creek is situated on Interstate 94 (I-94) midway between Detroit and Chicago.

=== Railroad and bus lines ===
The Battle Creek Amtrak Station serves Amtrak trains on the south end of the station and Greyhound and Indian Trails bus lines on the north side of the station. The Canadian National Railway and Norfolk Southern Railway provide freight service to the city.

=== Public transportation ===
Battle Creek Transit provides public transit services to Battle Creek area residents. Regular route bus service is provided throughout the City of Battle Creek.

=== Major highways ===
- I-94
- BL I-94
- I-194
- M-37
- M-66
- M-89
- M-96

=== Aviation ===
Kalamazoo's Kalamazoo-Battle Creek International Airport serves Battle Creek. Locally, W. K. Kellogg Airport serves the general aviation needs of the community. The airport is also home to Western Michigan University's College of Aviation, Duncan Aviation, WACO Classic Aircraft Corp. a bi-plane manufacturer, and formerly, the Michigan Air National Guard's 110th Attack Wing, which flies the MQ-9 Reaper UAV.

== Shopping malls and plazas ==
- Lakeview Square Mall
- McCamly Square
- Minges Brook Mall
- Minges Creek Plaza
- Harper Village Place
- Beckley Place
- Plaza West
- Minges Shoppes
- Capital Centre
- Capital Square
- Columbia Plaza
- Katie Plaza
- Battle Creek Plaza
- Columbia Center
- Classic Center
- Van Horn Plaza
- Capital Commons
- Urbandale Towne Center

== Notable people ==
See also People from Battle Creek, Michigan

- Lepha Eliza Bailey (1845−1924), author and lecturer
- Frankie Ballard, country music singer
- Lance Barber, television actor
- Johnny Bristol, Motown singer, songwriter and producer
- Margaret P. Colvin, 19th-century inventor of the Triumph Rotary Washer
- Nate Huffman, professional basketball player, 2001 Israeli Basketball Premier League MVP
- Betty Hutton, film actress
- Dr. John Harvey Kellogg, M.D., doctor and health food advocate
- William Keith Kellogg, cereal mogul
- John Kitzmiller, film actor
- Thomas Kneir, law enforcement
- Tony McGee, National Football League lineman
- Dick Martin, comedian and actor
- S. Isadore Miner (1863–1916), American journalist, poet, teacher, feminist
- Jason Newsted, bassist, played for Metallica from 1986 to 2001
- Lisa Rainsberger, Boston/Chicago Marathon winner
- Mike Reilly, former Major League Baseball umpire
- Bob Rush, Major League Baseball pitcher
- John Schwarz, former United States House of Representatives
- Emma L. Shaw, editor
- Rick Snyder, former Governor of Michigan
- John Stone, Colorado politician, sheriff of Jefferson County, Colorado, when the Columbine High School massacre occurred
- Sojourner Truth, abolitionist and women's rights activist
- Rob Van Dam, professional wrestler
- Junior Walker, Motown saxophonist and singer
- Bill Dowdy, Blue Note recording artist with the jazz trio, The Three Sounds
- Tauren Wells, Grammy nominated Christian pop singer
- Ellen G. White, American author and co-founder of the Seventh-day Adventist Church

== Sister cities ==
Battle Creek has sister city relationships with Santo André, Brazil and Takasaki, Japan.

Since 1981, Battle Creek and Takasaki have organized annual summer exchange programs for junior high and high school students and teachers.
