= Piccadilly Pub =

Restaurant chain in Massachusetts, USA

Piccadilly Pub logo

Piccadilly Pub was a chain of casual dining restaurants headquartered in the US state of Massachusetts. The first Piccadilly Pub restaurant was opened by William C. Martin in 1973 in the town of Westborough, Massachusetts.

The chain offered a menu of American cuisine, with particular emphasis on seafood such as fish and chips, New England clam chowder, fried clams, lobster, scallops, and shrimp.

Other items served included ribs, steaks, grilled honey lime island chicken salad, and Oreo cookie ice cream pie.

As of 2001, the chain had 11 locations. At its peak, the chain had 13 locations, all in Massachusetts and Connecticut; at the time it went out of business, it had nine locations. All locations closed on February 5, 2012.

== Locations ==
1. Auburn
2. Foxborough
3. Franklin
4. Marlborough
5. North Attleborough
6. North Reading
7. Randolph
8. Sturbridge
9. Tewksbury
10. Westborough
11. West Springfield
12. Wethersfield, Connecticut
13. Worcester
14. Peabody
15. Waltham

== Sale of operations ==
Piccadilly Pubs was acquired by Massachusetts Pub Group in 2008. Repechage Investments LLC, which controlled Piccadilly Pub through its Massachusetts Pub Group, filed for Chapter 11 bankruptcy protection in 2011.

The Worcester Telegram & Gazette reports that "Piccadilly Pub's assets have now been acquired by FranWorks Group of Calgary, Alberta, Canada."

== Closing ==
On February 5, 2012 an internal memo to all employees circulated that informed them that all remaining restaurant locations would be closing indefinitely, and that further information would be disclosed in a public announcement shortly.

On February 6, 2012 all restaurants remained closed, with the following memo on the door: “Piccadilly Pub Restaurants have temporarily closed. Currently, a date has not been set for a re-opening.”

By 2013, some Piccadilly restaurants had opened under new names, including The Pic and Bentley Pub.

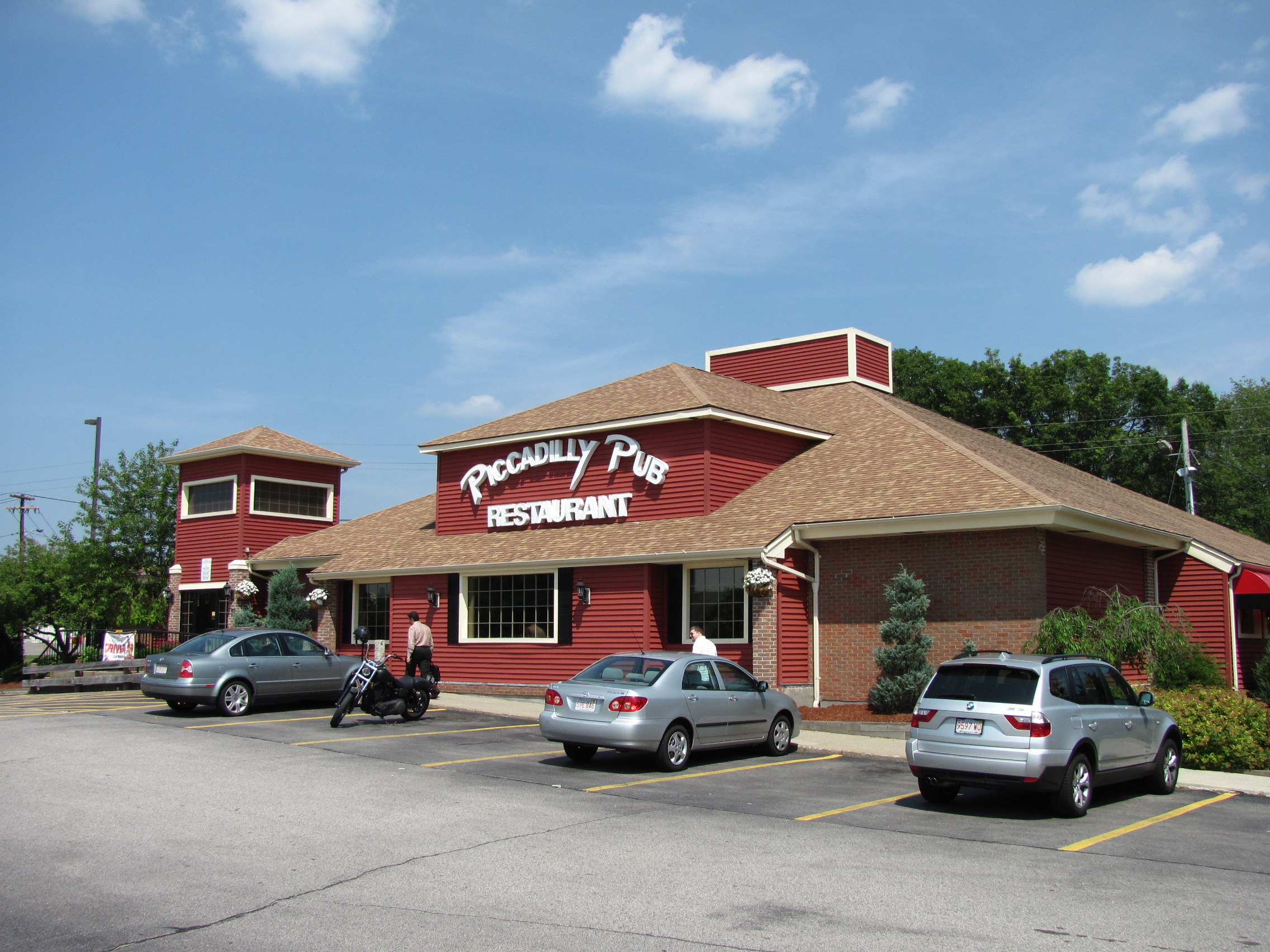
Location in North Attleborough MA, June 2010.
