= Fort Custer =

Fort Custer may refer to:

- Fort Custer (Montana), a historic U.S. Army fort in Montana, constructed in 1877, and abandoned in 1898
- Fort Custer Training Center, a Michigan Army National Guard training facility in Michigan, built in 1917

== See also ==
- Fort Custer National Cemetery, Michigan
- Fort Custer Recreation Area, Michigan
