= List of Important Bird Areas in Michigan =

This is the list of Important Bird Areas in Michigan, the status of which is officially recognized.

- Allegan State Game Area
- Au Sable State Forest
- Cross Village Township, Michigan
- Detroit River International Wildlife Refuge
- Fort Custer Recreation Area
- Fort Custer Training Center
- Harsens Island
- Huron-Manistee National Forests
- Lake Erie Metropark
- Ludington State Park
- Pointe Mouillee State Game Area
- Saginaw Bay
- Seney National Wildlife Refuge
- Sleeping Bear Dunes National Lakeshore
- St. Joseph River (Lake Michigan)
- Tawas Point State Park
- Waterloo Recreation Area
- Whitefish Point Light
- Wilderness State Park
- Yankee Springs Recreation Area
