= Fort Custer National Cemetery =

Veterans cemetery in Kalamazoo County, Michigan

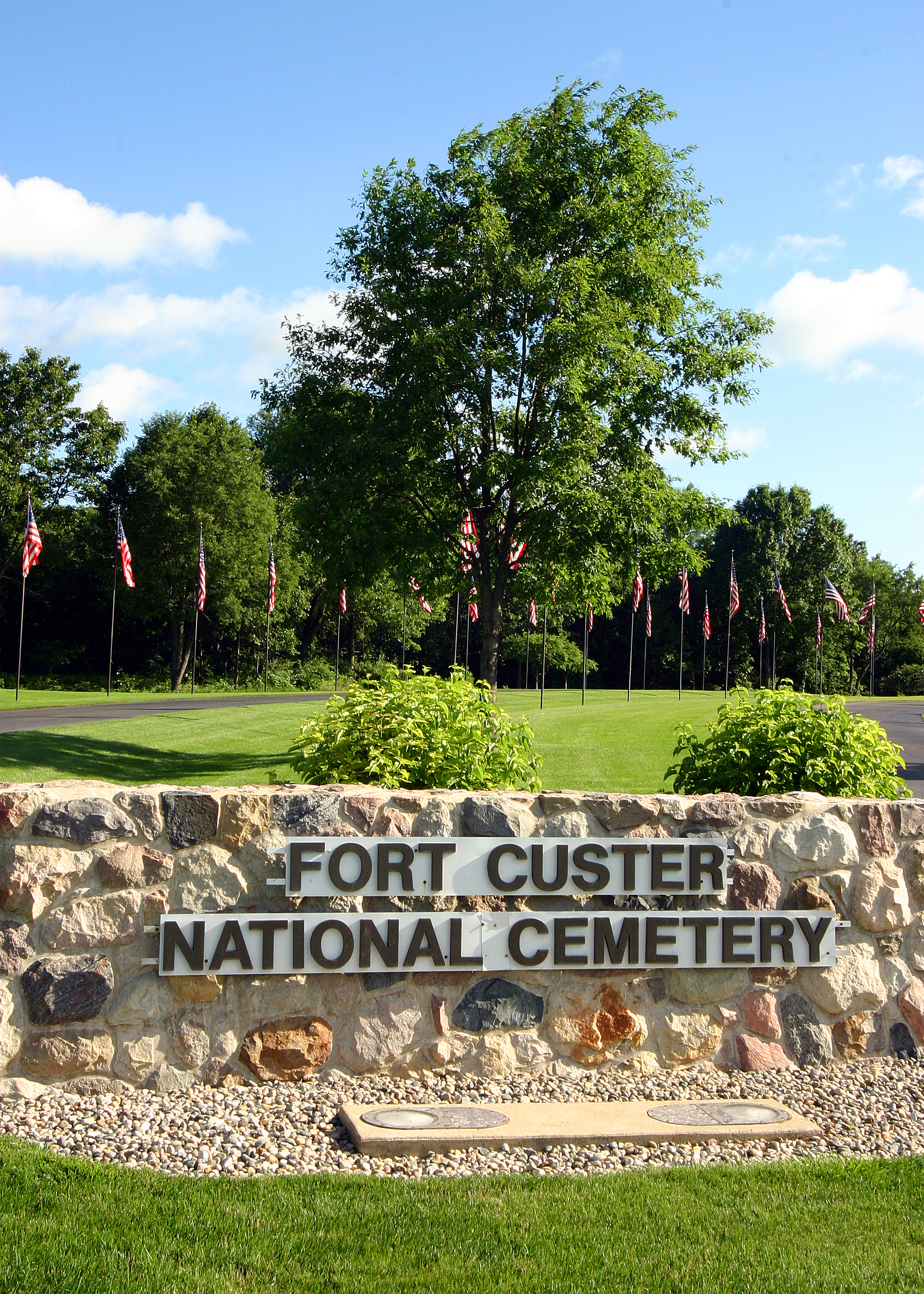
- Fort Custer National Cemetery
- Interactive map of Fort Custer National Cemetery

Details
- Established: 1943
- Location: Augusta, Michigan
- Country: United States
- Coordinates: 42°20′14″N 85°18′09″W
- Type: United States National Cemetery
- Owned by: United States Department of Veterans Affairs
- Size: 770.4 acres (311.8 ha)
- No. of graves: >40,000
- Website: Official
- Find a Grave: Fort Custer National Cemetery

Fort Custer National Cemetery is a United States National Cemetery located just outside the village of Augusta in Kalamazoo County, Michigan. It encompasses 770.4 acres (311.8 ha), and as of 2022 had 33,000 interments.

== History ==
Named for General George Armstrong Custer, the original Camp Custer was built in 1917 as part of the military mobilization during World War I. After the war, it also served as a demobilization camp. The cemetery itself was not created until 1943. During World War II Fort Custer was expanded to serve as a training ground and as a place to hold German prisoners of war.

Of the German POWs held during World War II, 26 died and were buried in the cemetery. Sixteen of them were killed when a truck carrying them from a work detail collided with a train near Blissfield, Michigan.

It was not until 1981 that Fort Custer cemetery officially became Fort Custer National Cemetery, receiving a large plot of land from the Fort Custer Training Center for expansion. In 1997 another expansion was made, with the addition of 60 acres (24 ha).

== Noteworthy monuments ==
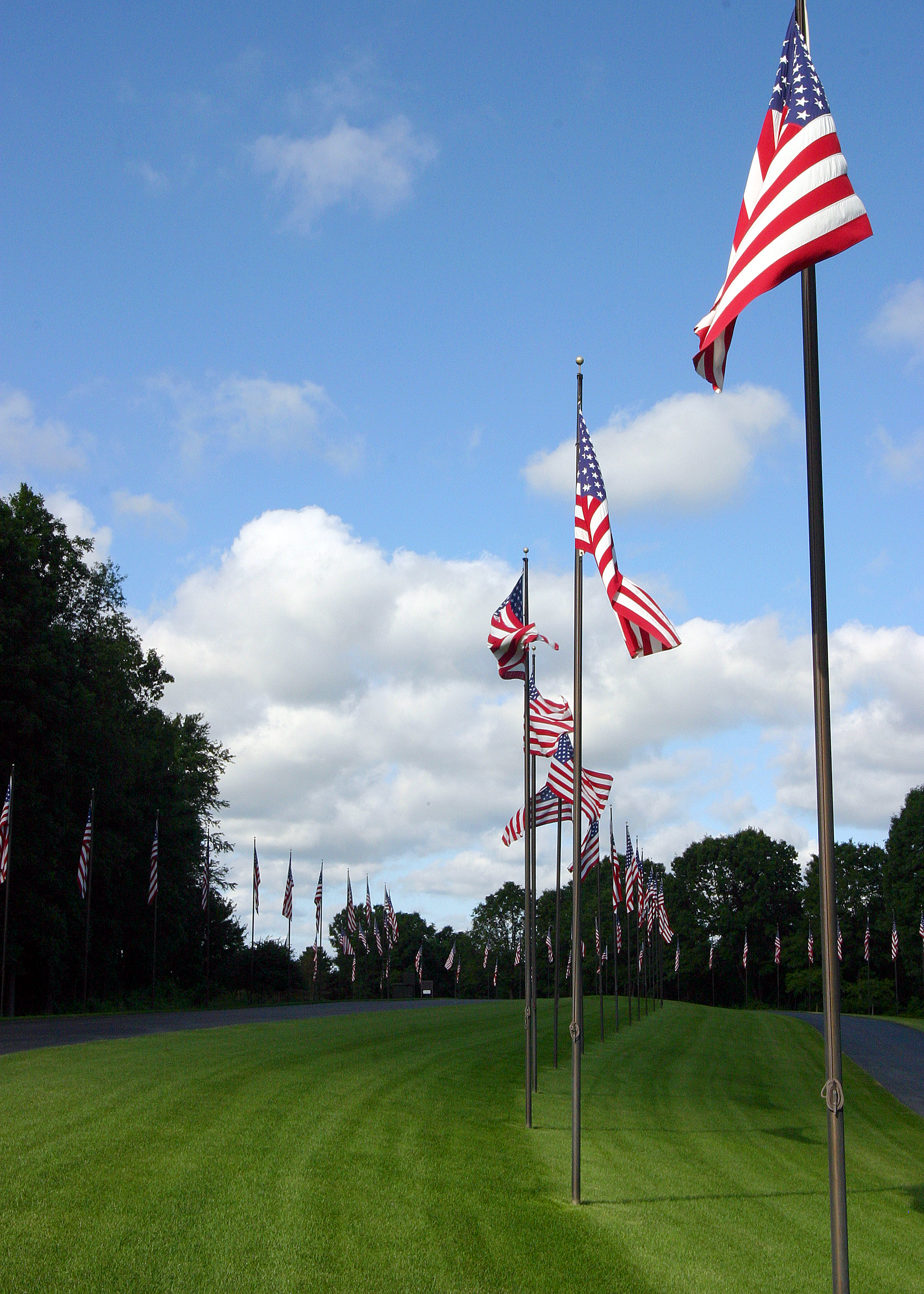
Avenue of Flags in Fort Custer National Cemetery.

- The Avenue of Flags, a row of 152 flag poles along the main road of the cemetery, as well as the main flagpole and an additional 50 flag poles, one for each state flag, in a semicircle at the road end.
- Fort Custer features a memorial pathway lined with a variety of memorials that honor America's veterans, donated by various organizations. As of 2007, there were 31 memorials at Fort Custer National Cemetery-most commemorating military organizations and veterans' groups.

== Notable burials ==
- Ben Adams (1936–2005), professional baseball player
- Don Boven (1925–2011), American basketball player and coach
- Wade Herbert Flemons (1940–1993), R&B musician and founding member of the band Earth, Wind & Fire

== See also ==
- Fort Custer Recreation Area – a state facility converted from the original Fort Custer military reservation
