= Charles Ross (American football) =

American football coach (1924–2007)

Biographical details
- Born: June 14, 1924; Plainwell, Michigan, U.S.
- Died: January 31, 2007 (aged 82)
- Education: Western Michigan University (1950, 1955); Michigan State University; Northern Illinois University; University of Pittsburgh

Coaching career (HC unless noted)

Football
- 1950–1952: Galesburg-Augusta HS (MI)
- 1953–1956: Nashville HS (MI)
- 1957: Galesburg-Augusta HS (MI)
- 1958: Olivet (backfield)
- 1959–1961: Millikin (DB)
- 1962: Northern Montana
- 1963–1969: Woodrow Wilson / Kennedy–King
- 1970–1975: Beloit
- 1976–1990: Appleton East HS (WI)
- 1991: Lakeland (assistant)
- 1992: Wrightstown HS (WI) (assistant)
- 1993: St. Mary HS (WI) (OC)

Basketball
- 1950–1953: Galesburg-Augusta HS (MI)
- 1953–1957: Nashville HS (MI)
- 1957–1958: Galesburg-Augusta HS (MI)
- 1958–1959: Olivet (assistant)
- 1970–1976: Beloit (assistant)

Baseball
- 1951–1953: Galesburg-Augusta HS (MI)
- 1960–1962: Millikin

Track and field
- 1958–1959: Olivet

Wrestling
- 1953–1956: Nashville HS (MI)
- 1957: Galesburg-Augusta HS (MI)
- 1960–1962: Millikin
- 1971–1976: Beloit

Head coaching record
- Overall: 7–53–1 (college football); 43–17–4 (junior college football); 79–52 (high school football; Appleton East); 34–18–2 (college baseball)

Accomplishments and honors

Awards
- NJCAA Coach of the Year (1963)

Charles Ross Jr. (June 14, 1924 – January 31, 2007) was an American collegiate athletics coach.

== Playing career ==
Ross grew up in Plainwell, Michigan, and attended Plainwell High School. He was team captain of the football and baseball teams. After graduating in 1943, he enlisted in the United States Navy during World War II. After being discharged from the military, Ross entered Western Michigan University. While a student, he was a professional boxer. During a softball game in Lawton, Michigan, he suffered a broken leg.

== Coaching career ==
In 1950, after graduating from Western Michigan, Ross was hired as the head football, basketball, and baseball coach for Galesburg-Augusta High School. He took over a football team that was a member of the Kalamazoo Valley Conference (KVC) and had lost all 22 of the team's starters from the previous season. In his first season as basketball coach, he helped lead the team to the KVC Association basketball tournament championship which was held in the Kalamazoo College Tredway gymnasium.

In 1953, Ross was hired as the football and basketball coach for Nashville High School in Nashville, Michigan. After four years he returned to Galesburg-Augusta. His return was short-lived as he then left for Olivet as the team's backfield coach and head track and field coach. In 1959, he was hired as the defensive backs coach for Millikin.

In 1962, Ross was hired as the head football coach for Northern Montana. He lasted only one season with the team, leading them to a winless 0–7 record. He was then hired as the head football coach for Kennedy–King College. He led the team to an overall record of 43–17–4 in seven seasons. In 1970, he was hired as the head football coach for Beloit. He coached for the school for six seasons, amassing an overall record of 7–46–1.

In 1976, Ross was hired as the head football coach for Appleton East High School. He retired after the 1990 season with a record of 79–52. His retirement was short as he returned to coaching in the spring as an assistant for Lakeland. He left and joined the staff for Wrightstown High School in 1992. At 69-years-old, Ross accepted his final coaching position as the offensive coordinator for St. Mary Catholic High School.

== Head coaching record ==
=== College football ===
Year	Team	Overall	Conference	Standing	Bowl/playoffs
Northern Montana Lights (Montana Collegiate Conference) (1962)
1962	Northern Montana	0–7	0–5	6th	
Northern Montana:		0–7	0–5		
Beloit Buccaneers (Midwest Conference) (1970–1975)
1970	Beloit	0–9	0–0	N/A	
1971	Beloit	1–8	0–0	N/A	
1972	Beloit	0–8–1	0–7–1	10th	
1973	Beloit	1–8	1–7	9th	
1974	Beloit	2–7	1–6	7th	
1975	Beloit	3–6	2–5	7th	
Beloit:		7–46–1	4–25–1		
Total:		7–53–1			
