= Scott Tower =

Monument in Holyoke, Massachusetts

Coordinates: 42°12′44″N 72°38′16″W

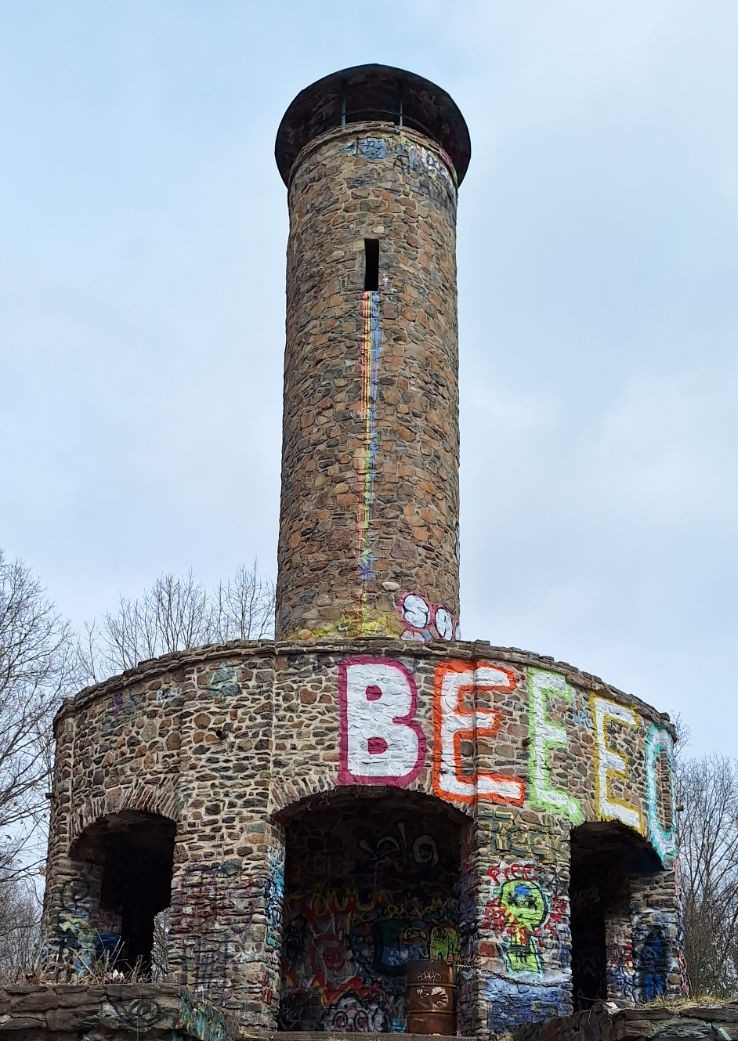
The Scott Tower in March 2024

The Walter Scott Memorial Tower, often referred to as Scott Tower, is a stone tower built in 1940 in Holyoke, Massachusetts, United States. The tower was constructed in Anniversary Hill Park and was named after the original owner and donor of the land Colonel Walter Scott. Improvements in the 1940s by the Civilian Conservation Corps and Works Progress Administration allowed for access via trails and footbridges, but since the 2000s the tower has been subject to graffiti and vandalism. Further improvements in 2023 were slated to allow for wheelchair access to the tower.

== History ==
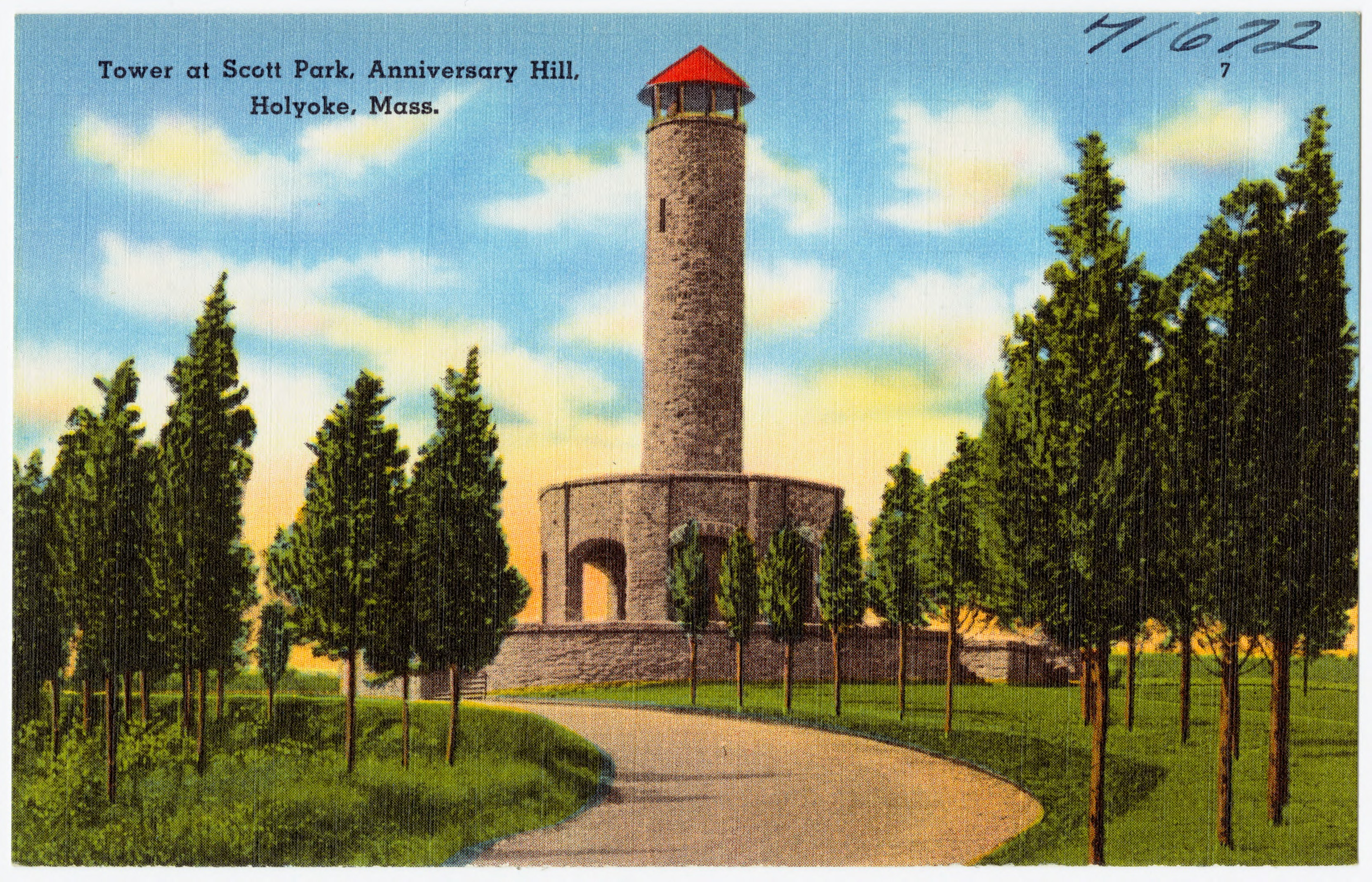
Postcard depicting Scott Tower in 1972

The land Scott Tower was built on, Anniversary Hill, was provided to the city of Holyoke through several donations from 1923 through 1939 to commemorate the city's 50th anniversary. The scope of the project was to create Holyoke's "own version of New York City's Central Park". The tower was completed in 1940, and work was done by the Works Progress Administration to clear trails, provide walking paths, and provide amenities in the area such as a baseball field and ski slope. The tower was used as a lookout for blackout tests in the following years, and for a time, the area saw frequent use, mainly by nature enthusiasts and sledders.

In 1960, the construction of Interstate 91 passed through Anniversary Hill Park, cutting off the western part of the park where Scott Tower was located and limiting accessibility; in the following years, the public use of the area significantly decreased. Little was done with the park for several decades that followed, though the tower was cleaned of graffiti in the 1970s thanks to the Legacy of Parks conservation program. In 2000, AT&T proposed the construction of a cell phone tower near the Scott Tower, which was completed in 2001. Improvements proposed in 2021 would allow for wheelchair access and underground burial of utilities connected to the cell phone tower, which were approved in November 2023.

== Description ==
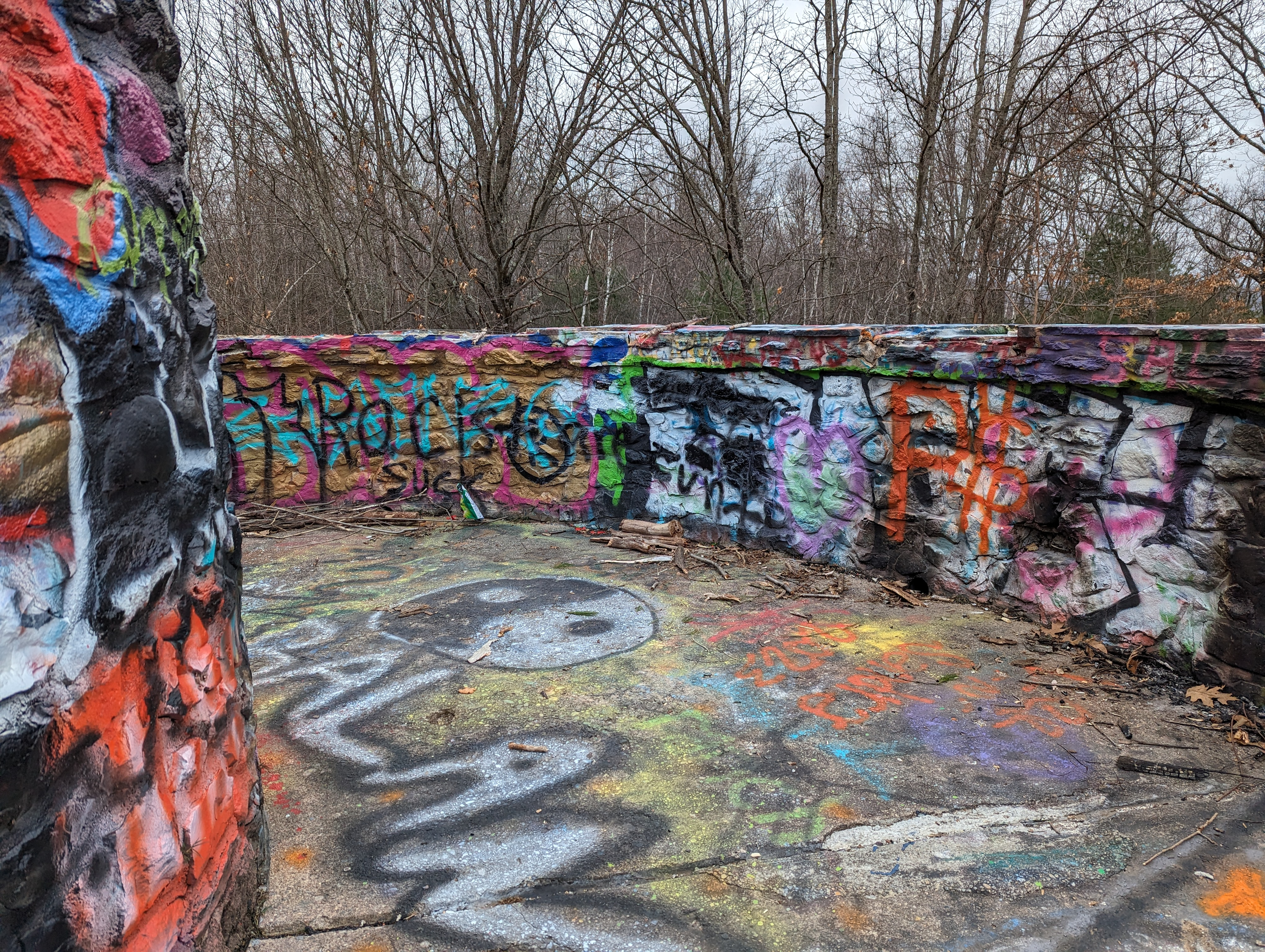
Graffiti on the inside of the tower's upper plaza

Scott Tower is a 56-foot (17-metre) tall stone tower built from stones excavated from the hill it stands on. The tower can be ascended to its top observation platform via a spiral staircase. The tower has been subject to graffiti throughout most of its existence. Due to the road under Interstate 91 being closed, visitors must walk a mile-long road to reach the tower.
