= 42nd Field Artillery Regiment =

US military unit

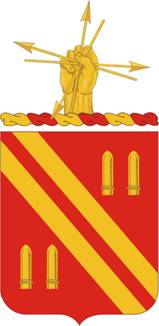
- Coat of arms
- Active: 1918
- Country: United States
- Branch: United States Army
- Type: Field artillery
- Motto: FESTINA LENTE (Make Haste Slowly).

Insignia
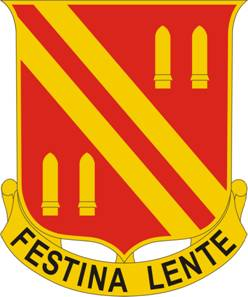
- Distinctive unit insignia

The 42nd Field Artillery Regiment is a field artillery regiment of the United States Army, first constituted 5 July 1918 in the National Army. The 4th Battalion was nicknamed the Straight Arrows. The Regimental motto is Festina Lente ("Make Haste, Slowly").

The 4th Battalion was active from 1918–19; 1933–46; 1959–70; and 1996–2014. It was last part of the 1st Brigade, 4th Infantry Division at Fort Carson, CO. Previously Fort Hood, TX. It was equipped with the M109A6 155-mm Paladin self propelled howitzer.

== 4th Battalion ==
The 4th Battalion was originally constituted on 5 July 1918 in the National Army as Battery D, 42nd Field Artillery, an element of the 14th Division (United States). It was organized on 10 August 1918 at Camp Custer, Michigan. Serving in one campaign of the First World War, Alsace 1918, the unit returned to Camp Custer, Michigan where it was demobilized on 7 February 1919.

The unit was reconstituted on 1 October 1933, in the Regular Army as Battery D, 42nd Field Artillery. It was absorbed on 1 October 1940, by Battery A, 42nd Field Artillery Battalion. Battery A, 42nd Field Artillery was redesignated on 1 October 1940, as Battery A, 42nd Field Artillery Battalion, and activated at Fort Benning, Georgia, as an element of the 4th Division (later redesignated as the 4th Infantry Division).

The 42nd Field Artillery Battalion participated in 5 campaigns in the Second World War: Normandy (with arrowhead indicating participation in the initial assault), Northern France, Rhineland, Ardennes-Alsace, and Central Europe. After the war, Battery A, 42nd Field Artillery Battalion was inactivated on 16 February 1946, at Camp Butner, North Carolina.

Battery A, 42nd Field Artillery Battalion was reactivated on 15 July 1947, at Fort Ord, California, before being consolidated on 28 June 1950, with Battery A, 42nd Coast Artillery Battalion (which had been first organized in 1907). The consolidated unit designated as Battery A, 42d Field Artillery Battalion). Former Battery D, 42nd Field Artillery, was reconstituted on 1 April 1957, in the Regular Army and redesignated as Headquarters and Headquarters Battery, 4th Battalion, 42nd Artillery.

It was redesignated on 23 April 1959, as Headquarters and Headquarters Battery, 4th Howitzer Battalion, 42nd Artillery, and assigned to the 4th Infantry Division with its organic elements concurrently constituted. The Battalion activated on 6 May 1959 at Fort Lewis, Washington. It was redesignated on 1 October 1963, as the 4th Battalion, 42nd Artillery.

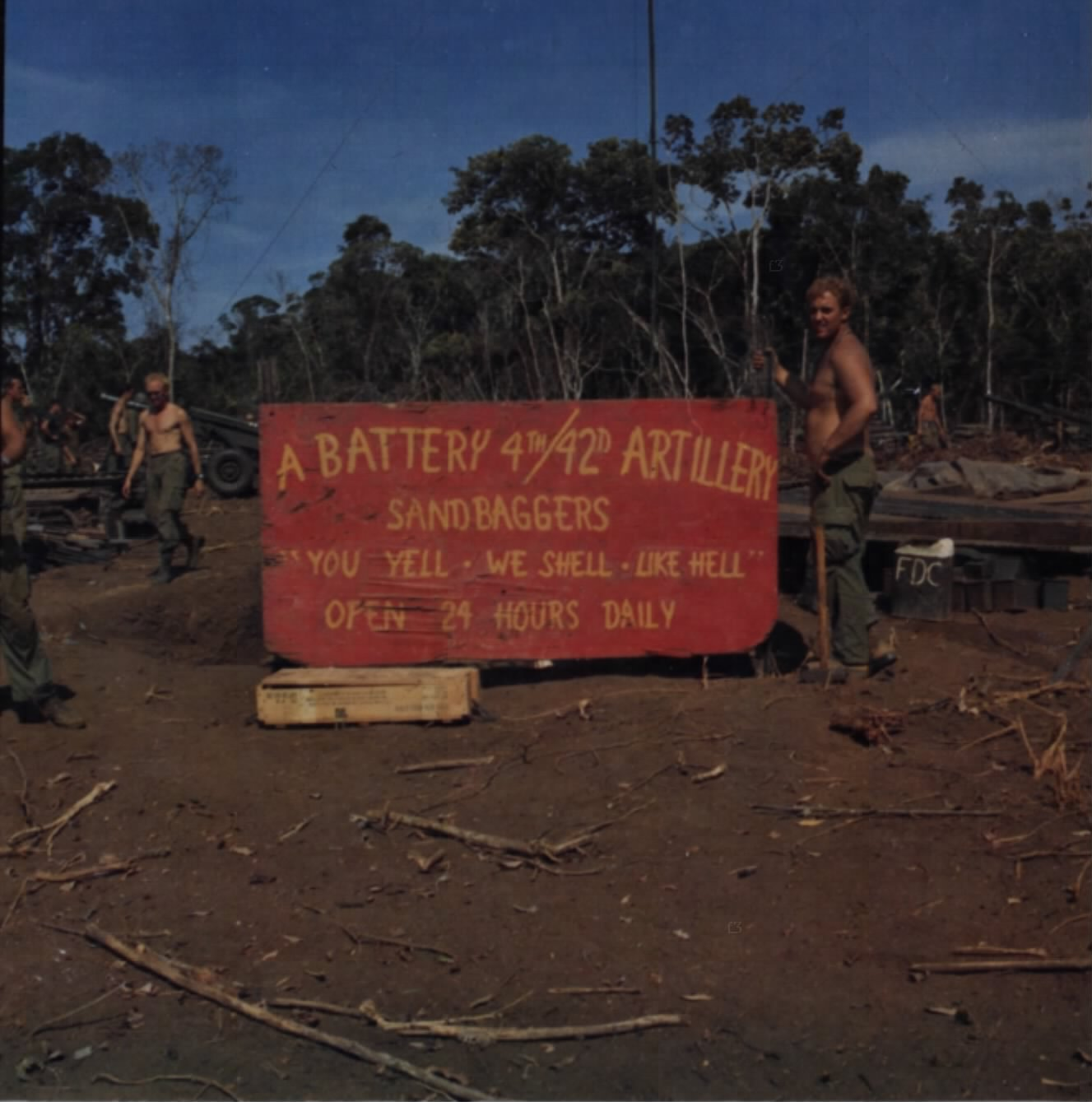
Sign of Battery A, 4th Battalion, 42nd Artillery at Firebase Navel, 17 April 1970

The Battalion served as part of the 4th Infantry Division through 11 campaigns in Vietnam, arriving in August 1966 as a towed 105mm howitzer battalion to render direct support to the 4th's 2nd Brigade.

The unit participated in the following campaigns:

- Counteroffensive Phase II
- Counteroffensive Phase III
- Tet Counteroffensive
- Counteroffensive Phase IV
- Counteroffensive Phase V
- Counteroffensive Phase VI
- Tet 69/Counteroffensive
- Summer-Fall 1969
- Winter-Spring 1970
- Sanctuary Counteroffensive
- Counteroffensive Phase VII

The unit returned from Vietnam and was inactivated on 15 December 1970, at Fort Carson, Colorado.

While inactive, the unit was redesignated on 1 September 1971 as the 4th Battalion, 42nd Field Artillery, and remained inactive until 1996.

=== Last unit assignments ===
From 1996 to 2009, the battalion was based at Fort Hood, TX and then at Fort Carson, Colorado, until 2014, as part of 4th Infantry Division. It came under the command of Division Artillery and later affiliated to 1st Brigade. Each of the three gun batteries (A, B, C – later only A and B), supported a different battalion in the brigade. Headquarters and Headquarters Battery (HHB) provided the necessary support components for the running of the battalion and was also home to Fire Support Specialists or "Fisters." The battalion was the first in the Army to transition to the new Conservative Heavy Division (CHD) design, and also the first Artillery Battalion to test, field, and train with the digital Force XXI Battle Command Brigade and Below (FBCB2) system.

The battalion was equipped with the M109A6 Paladin Self Propelled Howitzer, which fires a 155mm family of munitions, and is the most technologically advanced cannon in the Army inventory. While a field artillery battalion, they also deployed and conducted operations similar to that of an infantry battalion in order to relieve infantry shortages in Afghanistan / Iraq.

The battalion deactivated on 17 March 2014 at Fort Carson, CO.

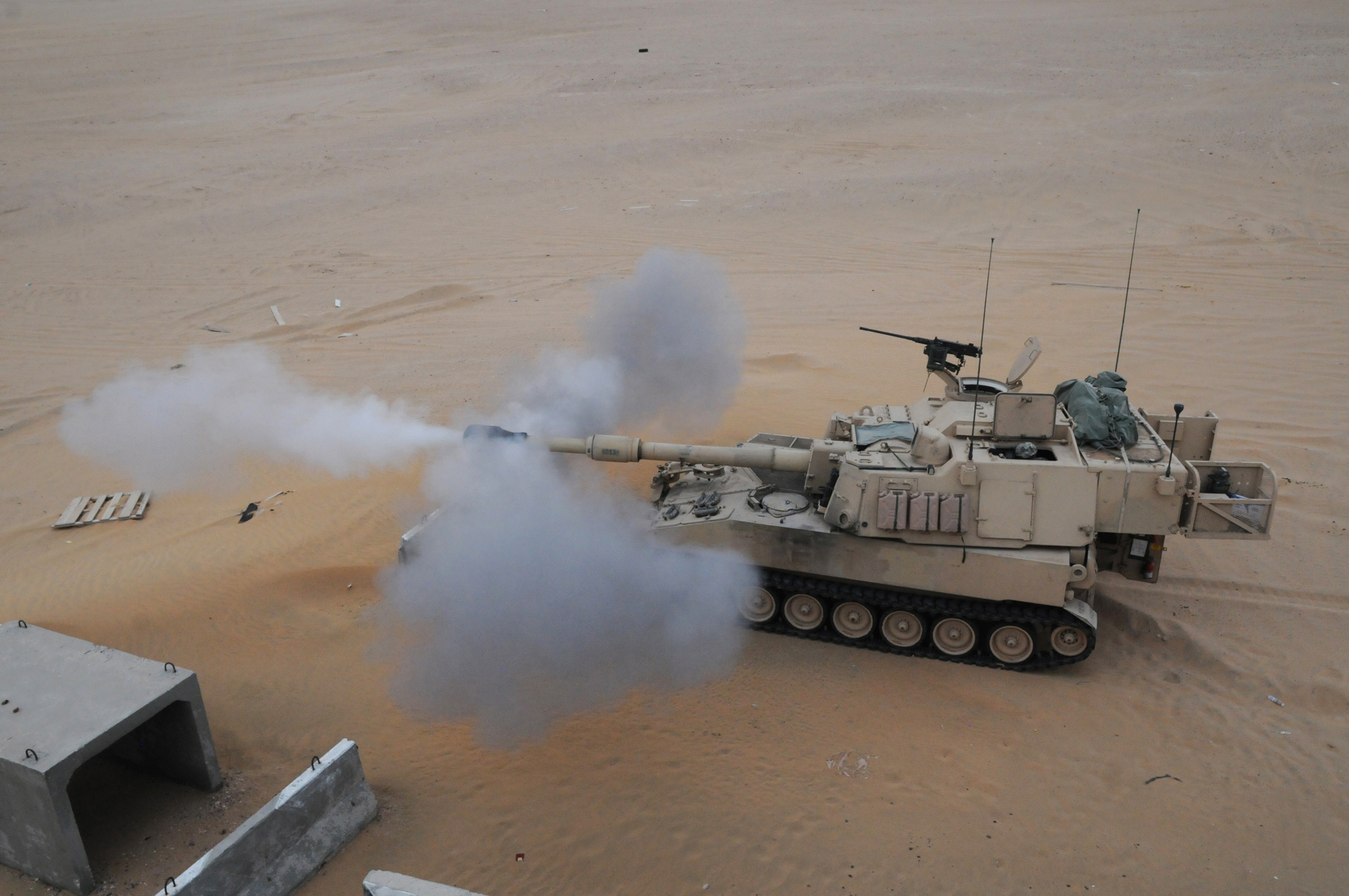
Camp Buehring, Kuwait. Soldiers assigned to Battery B, 4th Battalion, 42nd Field Artillery Regiment, 1st Armored Brigade Combat Team, 4th Infantry Division, fire a round from an M109A6 Paladin self-propelled howitzer during the direct fire portion of Table VI team qualifications at Udairi Range, 3 April 2013.

=== Operation Iraqi Freedom ===
Alerted on 19 January 2003, 4-42 FA and the 4th Infantry Division was scheduled to take part in the Iraq War in the spring of 2003 by spearheading an advance from Turkey into northern Iraq. The Turkish Parliament refused to grant permission for the operation and the battalion's equipment remained on ships during the initial buildup for the invasion - meaning that 4ID and 4-42 would have to reroute operations through Kuwait instead of Turkey. The battalion deployed to Iraq through Kuwait in late April 2003.

Combat operations were conducted initially in the area of Taji Airfield, just outside Baghdad. The battalion moved north to the Tikrit area, leaving Battery B at Taji in support of Task Force Gunner until approximately October 2003. The battalion (less B Btry until fall) was stationed at FOB Arrow near the village of Ad-Dawr, slightly to the southeast of Tikrit along the Tigris River, with various fire support elements attached to 1-22 Infantry, 1-10 Cavalry, 1-66 and 3-66 Armor, as far south as Samarra and north past Tikrit. During their time at FOB Arrow the battalion conducted infantry operations in their sector. These operations included dismounted OP/LP operations around their area (specifically Ad-Dawr), mounted and dismounted combat patrols, raids against high-value targets or suspected insurgents, and general patrolling and stability operations in and around Ad-Dawr. In addition to these non-traditional roles, the battalion still provided fire support to the 1st Brigade and other units in the area. 4–42 continued to conduct combat operations until their redeployment in March 2004. During this first deployment to Iraq, the battalion was responsible for capturing several former regime members that were wanted by the coalition, captured scores of weapons and explosives, and engaged in direct combat with insurgents and terrorists in their area.

OIF I operations included:

- Operation Planet X (15 May 2003)
- Operation Peninsula Strike (9 June 2003 – 12 June 2003)
- Operation Desert Scorpion (15 June 2003 – 29 June 2003)
- Operation Sidewinder (29 June 2003 – 7 July 2003)
- Operation Soda Mountain (12 July 2003 – 17 July 2003)
- Operation Ivy Serpent (12 July 2003 – 21 July 2003)
- Operation Ivy Lightning (12 August 2003)
- Operation Ivy Needle (26 August 2003 – ?)
- Operation Industrial Sweep (October 2003)
- Operation Ivy Cyclone (7 November 2003 – ?)
- Operation Ivy Cyclone II (17 November 2003 – ?)
- Operation Red Dawn (13 December 2003) The battalion had unit members on the objective during the capture of former Iraqi President Saddam Hussein.
- Operation Ivy Blizzard (17 December 2003 – ?)
- Operation Arrowhead Blizzard (17 December 2003 – ?)

The battalion helped to rebuild schools and adopted the Nasiba Primary School for Girls, completing its refurbishment in November 2003. Much focus was given to providing security to the local population, ensuring safe and secure access to public services such as power and water, food distribution and fuel/petroleum sales.

== Two tours in Iraq ==
The battalion was deployed again in December 2005 to Camp Taji, 14 kilometers north of Baghdad. The Straight Arrow battalion was given the task of providing security for Camp Taji and maintaining a presence on Highway 1. They returned to Fort Hood in December 2006.

The battalion deployed to Iraq for its third tour in March 2008 as part of Operation Iraqi Freedom 07-09. This tour saw the battalion separated from its parent brigade and attached to 2nd Brigade, 101st Airborne Division. Headquartered inside the International Zone of Baghdad, the Straight Arrows were charged with the task of supporting the Iraqi Army and monitoring the Karkh and Mansour districts of Baghdad. During this deployment the battalion supported two joint-security stations and conducted more than 3,500 total patrols in the district. The Straight Arrows then redeployed in March 2009 to Fort Hood, Texas for the last time.

=== Return and restationing at Fort Carson ===
Once they redeployed and uncased their colors, the battalion changed commanders in June 2009 and immediately moved to Fort Carson, Colo. July and August 2009 were spent standing up the battalion at Fort Carson, establishing systems, conducting reset operations and building combat power.

The fall of 2009 gave the battalion opportunities to conduct multiple squad and platoon-level training events. The Straight Arrows finalized the fielding of their howitzers from PMHBCT during the week of Thanksgiving and then immediately conducted Table VIII certification. The training provided soldiers an excellent environment with temperatures as low as minus 30 degrees and several inches of snow. In January 2010, 4–42 FA deployed in similar weather conditions to provide indirect fires in support of Alpha Company, 3rd Battalion, 75th Ranger training on Fort Carson ranges. The battalion's deployment mission was finalized and the Straight Arrows transitioned the entire formation to a motorized infantry battalion.

The battalion participated in Raider Blitz, a brigade field training exercise, as a motorized infantry battalion. Then the Straight Arrow battalion, as a member of the 1st (Raider) Brigade Combat Team, 4th Infantry Division, deployed to the Joint Readiness Training Center for counterinsurgency training, in April 2010, with the battalion conducting maneuver operations as a battlespace operator. The battalion also completed deployment preparations, conducted final training for theater requirements and executed torch and advance party operations to Afghanistan.

=== Operation Enduring Freedom ===
The battalion completed its rotation to Afghanistan as part of the 1st Brigade Combat Team, 4th Infantry Division's deployment in support of Operation Enduring Freedom. The battalion initiated relief in place/transfer of authority with 4th Squadron, 73rd Cavalry Regiment, part of 4th Brigade, 82nd Airborne 82nd Airborne in late July 2010 and assumed responsibility for security for the city of Farah, Farah Province, Afghanistan. The unit conducted security force assistance operations with the Afghan National Army, and the Afghanistan provincial police forces. The battalion focused on security operations in support of the Farah province and the city of Farah as well as increasing Afghan security forces capabilities and capacities across the entire province.The battalion was able to make great progress in the Farah Province through constantly engaging the Taliban, by taking the Dukin/Charpoc Charmas area along with improving the security and quality of life for the Masaw District. 4-42 FA was relieved in place in July 2011 by the 2d Brigade Combat Team Special Troops Battalion, 2d Brigade, 4th Infantry Division, and redeployed to Fort Carson.

The battalion was de-activated by the Army along with the 1st Battalion, 22nd Infantry Regiment on 17 March 2014 at Fort Carson, Colorado. The colors of the unit were cased and sent to the Army Center of Military History.

=== Battalion decorations ===
- Presidential Unit Citation (Army), Streamer embroidered LUXEMBOURG (42nd Field Artillery Battalion cited; WD GO 30, 1946)
- Valorous Unit Award for service in Iraq during Operation Red Dawn (Capture of Saddam Hussein) (DA GO 2009–11 16 December 2009)
- Valorous Unit Award for service in Iraq (OIF 07-09) (DA GO 2010–16–3 September 2010)
- Meritorious Unit Commendation for service in Iraq (PO 208-26, 27 July 2009)
- Meritorious Unit Commendation for service in Afghanistan (OEF 10-11) (PO 202-15, 21 July 2011)
- Army Superior Unit Award for successful participation in the Army's Advanced Warfighting Experiment; March 1997 (DA GO 0125 June 2001)
- Belgian Fourragère 1940 (42nd Field Artillery Battalion cited; DA GO 43, 1950)
- Cited in the Order of the Day of the Belgian Army for action in BELGIUM (42nd Field Artillery Battalion cited; DA GO 43, 1950)

== Regimental lineage ==
Constituted 29 June 1918 in the Regular Army as the 1st Battalion, 42d Artillery (Coast Artillery Corps)

Organized 7 August 1918 in France

Inactivated 17 August 1921 at Camp Eustis, Virginia

Redesignated 1 July 1924 as the 1st Battalion, 42d Coast Artillery

Disbanded 14 June 1944

Reconstituted 28 June 1950 in the Regular Army; concurrently consolidated with the 42d Field Artillery Battalion (active) (see ANNEX) and consolidated unit designated as the 42d Field Artillery Battalion, an element of the 4th Infantry Division

Relieved 1 April 1957 from assignment to the 4th Infantry Division; concurrently reorganized and redesignated as the 42d Artillery, a parent regiment under the Combat Arms Regimental System

Redesignated 1 September 1971 as the 42d Field Artillery

Withdrawn 15 January 1996 from the Combat Arms Regimental System and reorganized under the United States Army Regimental System

ANNEX

Constituted 5 July 1918 in the National Army as the 42d Field Artillery and assigned to the 14th Division

Organized 10 August 1918 at Camp Custer, Michigan

Demobilized 7 February 1919 at Camp Custer, Michigan

Reconstituted 1 October 1933 in the Regular Army as the 42d Field Artillery

Redesignated 1 October 1940 as the 42d Field Artillery Battalion, assigned to the 4th Division (later redesignated as the 4th Infantry Division), and activated at Fort Benning, Georgia

Inactivated 16 February 1946 at Camp Butner, North Carolina

Activated 15 July 1947 at Fort Ord, California

== Distinctive unit insignia ==
- Description

A Gold color metal and enamel device 1 1/16 inches (2.7 cm) in height overall consisting of a shield blazoned: Gules, two bendlets between four shells, two in chief and two in base, all Or. Attached below the shield a Gold scroll inscribed “FESTINA LENTE” in Black letters.

- Symbolism

Scarlet is the color used for Artillery. The shells indicate the nature of the organization and with the bendlets produce the numerical designation of the organization.

- Background

The distinctive unit insignia was originally approved for the 42d Field Artillery Battalion on 7 May 1942. It was redesignated for the 42d Artillery Regiment on 26 November 1958. The insignia was redesignated for the 42d Field Artillery Regiment effective 1 September 1971.

== Coat of arms ==
- Blazon
  - Shield: Gules, two bendlets between four shells, two in chief and two in base, all Or.
  - Crest: On a wreath of the colors Or and Gules a dexter hand grasping four spears pointing in four directions of the compass Or.
  - Motto: FESTINA LENTE (Make Haste Slowly).
- Symbolism
  - Shield: Scarlet is the color used for Artillery. The shells indicate the nature of the organization and with the bendlets produce the numerical designation of the organization.
  - Crest: The hand grasping the spears indicates firepower in any direction.
- Background: The coat of arms was originally approved for the 42d Field Artillery Battalion on 7 May 1942. It was redesignated for the 42d Artillery Regiment on 26 November 1958. The insignia was redesignated for the 42d Field Artillery Regiment effective 1 September 1971.

== Campaign participation credit ==
- World War I: Alsace 1918
- World War II: Normandy (with arrowhead); Northern France; Rhineland; Ardennes-Alsace; Central Europe
- Vietnam: Counteroffensive, Phase II; Counteroffensive, Phase III; Tet Counteroffensive; Counteroffensive, Phase IV; Counteroffensive, Phase V; Counteroffensive, Phase VI; Tet 69/Counteroffensive; Summer-Fall 1969; Winter-Spring 1970; Sanctuary Counteroffensive; Counteroffensive, Phase VII; Consolidation I; Consolidation II; Cease-Fire
- Operation Iraqi Freedom: Liberation of Iraq, 2003; Transition of Iraq, 2003–2004; Iraqi Governance, 2004–2005; National Resolution, 2005–2006; Iraqi Surge, 2007–2008; Iraqi Sovereignty, 2009-2010
- Operation Enduring Freedom (Afghanistan): Consolidation III, 2010–2011; Transition I, 2011-2011

== Decorations ==

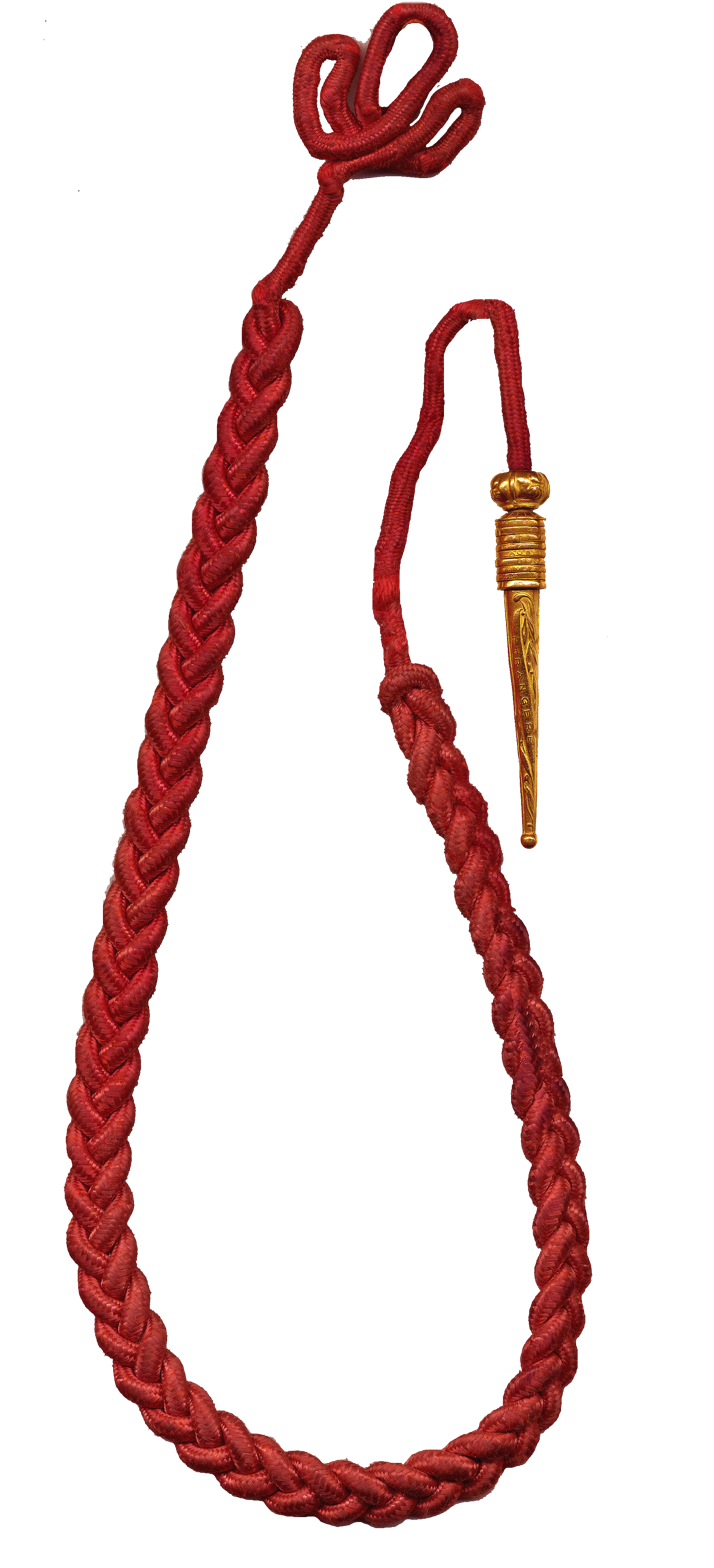
- Presidential Unit Citation (Army), Streamer embroidered LUXEMBOURG (42nd Field Artillery Battalion cited; WD GO 30, 1946)
- Valorous Unit Award for service in Iraq during Operation Red Dawn (Capture of Saddam Hussein) (DA GO 2009–11 16 December 2009)
- Valorous Unit Award for service in Iraq (OIF 07–09) (DA GO 2010–16–3 September 2010)
- Meritorious Unit Commendation for service in Iraq (PO 208–26, 27 July 2009)
- Meritorious Unit Commendation for service in Afghanistan (OEF 10–11) (PO 202–15, 21 July 2011)
- Army Superior Unit Award for successful participation in the Army's Advanced Warfighting Experiment; March 1997 (DA GO 0125 June 2001)
- Belgian Fourragère 1940 (42nd Field Artillery Battalion cited; DA GO 43, 1950)
- Cited in the Order of the Day of the Belgian Army for action in BELGIUM (42nd Field Artillery Battalion cited; DA GO 43, 1950)
