= Galesburg, Michigan =

- City
- City of Galesburg
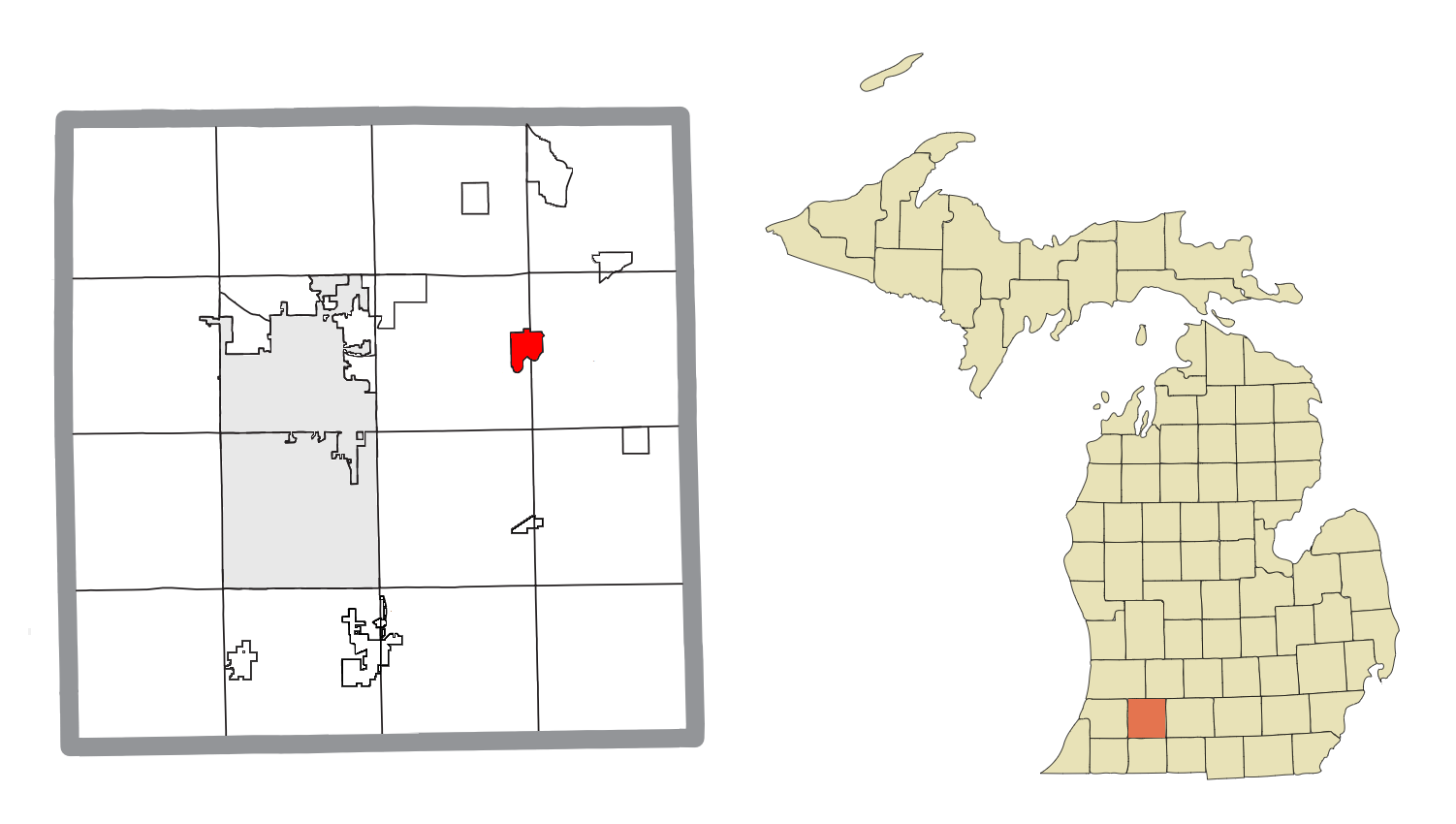
- Location within Kalamazoo County

- Location within the state of Michigan Location within the United States
- Coordinates: 42°17′21″N 85°25′09″W
- Country: United States
- State: Michigan
- County: Kalamazoo
- Settled: 1835
- Incorporated: 1861 (village); 1931 (city)

Government
  - Type: Mayor–council
  - Mayor: Linda Marble
  - Clerk: Lisa McNees

Area
  - Total: 1.46 sq mi (3.78 km^{2})
  - Land: 1.42 sq mi (3.67 km^{2})
  - Water: 0.042 sq mi (0.11 km^{2})
- Elevation: 791 ft (241 m)

Population (2020)
  - Total: 2,049
  - Density: 1,442.96/sq mi (557.13/km^{2})
- Time zone: UTC-5 (Eastern (EST))
  - Summer (DST): UTC-4 (EDT)
- ZIP code(s): 49053
- Area code: 269
- FIPS code: 26-31260
- GNIS feature ID: 0626603
- Website: www.galesburgcity.org

Galesburg is a city in Kalamazoo County in the U.S. state of Michigan. The population was 2,049 at the 2020 census.

Galesburg is located along the north side of the Kalamazoo River. The city is situated on M-96 and is just north of I-94 (with exits due south of the city's west side and about one mile (1.6 km) to the east). Kalamazoo is about ten miles (16 km) to the west and Battle Creek is about ten miles (16 km) to the east.

== History ==
Galesburg was established in 1835 originally with the name Morton. It was platted in 1837 when it was given its current name and incorporated as a village in 1861 and as a city in 1931. Galesburg is named for George L. Gale, an early settler.

== Geography ==
According to the United States Census Bureau, the city has a total area of 1.45 square miles (3.76 km^{2}), of which 1.41 square miles (3.65 km^{2}) is land and 0.04 square miles (0.10 km^{2}) is water.The Kalamazoo River runs through Galesburg.

== Demographics ==
Historical population
Census	Pop.	Note	%±
1870	140		—
1890	702		—
1900	689		−1.9%
1910	656		−4.8%
1920	692		5.5%
1930	936		35.3%
1940	1,040		11.1%
1950	1,200		15.4%
1960	1,410		17.5%
1970	1,355		−3.9%
1980	1,822		34.5%
1990	1,863		2.3%
2000	1,988		6.7%
2010	2,009		1.1%
2020	2,049		2.0%
U.S. Decennial Census

=== 2020 census ===
As of the 2020 census, Galesburg had a population of 2,049. The median age was 36.8 years. 25.7% of residents were under the age of 18 and 14.7% of residents were 65 years of age or older. For every 100 females there were 94.8 males, and for every 100 females age 18 and over there were 90.6 males age 18 and over.

95.1% of residents lived in urban areas, while 4.9% lived in rural areas.

There were 795 households in Galesburg, of which 32.5% had children under the age of 18 living in them. Of all households, 36.5% were married-couple households, 21.5% were households with a male householder and no spouse or partner present, and 31.2% were households with a female householder and no spouse or partner present. About 32.5% of all households were made up of individuals and 10.1% had someone living alone who was 65 years of age or older.

There were 849 housing units, of which 6.4% were vacant. The homeowner vacancy rate was 1.0% and the rental vacancy rate was 6.5%.

Racial composition as of the 2020 census
Race	Number	Percent
White	1,758	85.8%
Black or African American	76	3.7%
American Indian and Alaska Native	6	0.3%
Asian	10	0.5%
Native Hawaiian and Other Pacific Islander	0	0.0%
Some other race	32	1.6%
Two or more races	167	8.2%
Hispanic or Latino (of any race)	71	3.5%

=== 2010 census ===
As of the census of 2010, there were 2,009 people, 766 households, and 497 families residing in the city. The population density was 1,424.8 inhabitants per square mile (550.1/km^{2}). There were 837 housing units at an average density of 593.6 per square mile (229.2/km^{2}). The racial makeup of the city was 93.5% White, 2.4% African American, 0.5% Native American, 0.3% Asian, 0.5% from other races, and 2.6% from two or more races. Hispanic or Latino of any race were 2.4% of the population.

There were 766 households, of which 36.0% had children under the age of 18 living with them, 38.9% were married couples living together, 19.1% had a female householder with no husband present, 6.9% had a male householder with no wife present, and 35.1% were non-families. 27.8% of all households were made up of individuals, and 6.4% had someone living alone who was 65 years of age or older. The average household size was 2.47 and the average family size was 2.98.

The median age in the city was 35.6 years. 25.8% of residents were under the age of 18; 8.8% were between the ages of 18 and 24; 27.6% were from 25 to 44; 25.4% were from 45 to 64; and 12.4% were 65 years of age or older. The gender makeup of the city was 47.3% male and 52.7% female.

=== 2000 census ===
As of the census of 2000, there were 1,988 people, 765 households, and 491 families residing in the city. The population density was 1,429.8 inhabitants per square mile (552.0/km^{2}). There were 811 housing units at an average density of 583.3 per square mile (225.2/km^{2}). The racial makeup of the city was 96.38% White, 0.96% African American, 0.91% Native American, 0.15% Asian, 0.20% from other races, and 1.41% from two or more races. Hispanic or Latino of any race were 1.16% of the population.

There were 765 households, out of which 37.0% had children under the age of 18 living with them, 41.4% were married couples living together, 17.6% had a female householder with no husband present, and 35.8% were non-families. 28.4% of all households were made up of individuals, and 8.2% had someone living alone who was 65 years of age or older. The average household size was 2.46 and the average family size was 2.98.

In the city, the population was spread out, with 27.3% under the age of 18, 11.0% from 18 to 24, 30.4% from 25 to 44, 18.6% from 45 to 64, and 12.7% who were 65 years of age or older. The median age was 33 years. For every 100 females, there were 98.6 males. For every 100 females age 18 and over, there were 91.5 males.

The median income for a household in the city was $34,663, and the median income for a family was $44,038. Males had a median income of $35,167 versus $24,886 for females. The per capita income for the city was $16,785. About 11.0% of families and 12.9% of the population were below the poverty line, including 19.1% of those under age 18 and 5.0% of those age 65 or over.

== Notable people ==
- William Rufus Shafter, United States military officer

== Schools ==
In 1951, members of the Galesburg community and those of neighboring Augusta joined to form a public school district. Galesburg-Augusta Community Schools currently consist of a primary school and a high school in Galesburg, and a middle school in Augusta.
