= 14th Infantry Division (United States) =

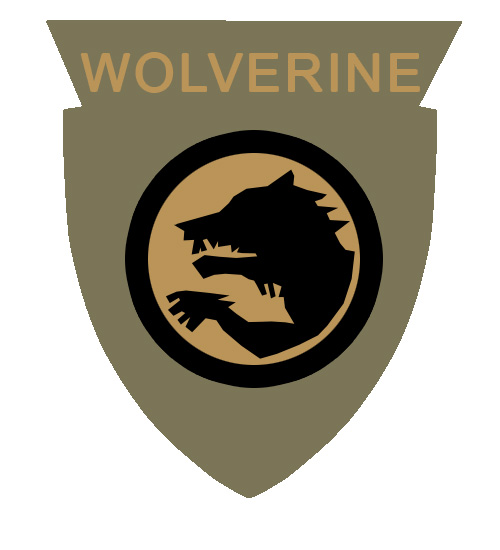
- Active: 1918-1919
- Country: United States
- Branch: United States Army
- Type: Infantry
- Size: Division
- Garrison/HQ: Camp Custer, Michigan
- Nickname: Wolverines

Commanders
- Notable commanders: Colonel Sam Burkhardt Brigadier General Howard L. Laubach Major General Grote Hutcheson

The 14th Infantry Division or "Wolverine Division" was a unit formed at Camp Custer, Michigan in July 1918. In October 1918, Camp Custer was hit with the Great Influenza Epidemic and Brigadier General Howard Laubach put the entire post on quarantine shutting down theaters, dining facilities and shutting off the post from the nearby town. Even still, 674 soldiers and medical personnel died. The Division completed training in August 1918 and the armistice was signed in November. The division was demobilized In January 1919 except those soldiers and subordinate units assigned to the Regular Army.

== Commanders ==
- Colonel Sam Burkhardt - July 28, 1918 - Sept. 17, 1918
- Brigadier General Howard L. Laubach - Sept. 17, 1918 - Nov. 19, 1918
- Major General Grote Hutcheson - Nov. 19, 1918 -

== Subordinate Units ==
- 14th Headquarters Troop
- 27th Infantry Brigade
  - 10th Infantry Regiment
  - 77th Infantry Regiment
  - 41st Machine Gun Battalion
- 28th Infantry Brigade
  - 40th Infantry Regiment
  - 78th Infantry Regiment
  - 42nd Machine Gun Battalion
- 14th Field Artillery Brigade
  - 40th Field Artillery (75 mm)
  - 41st Field Artillery (75 mm)
  - 42nd Field Artillery (155 mm)
  - 14th Trench Mortar Battery
- 40th Machine Gun Battalion
- 214th Engineers
- 214th Field Signal Battalion
- 14th Division Train
