= Galesburg-Augusta Community Schools =

School district in Michigan

Address
- 1076 North 37th Galesburg, Kalamazoo County, Michigan, 49053; United States
- Coordinates: 42°17′58.6″N 85°24′13″W

District information
- Grades: PreKindergarten–12
- Established: 1951
- Superintendent: Lindsay Newton
- Schools: 4
- Budget: $24,711,000 2022–2023 expenditures
- NCES District ID: 2615450

Students and staff
- Students: 995 (2024–2025)
- Teachers: 67.86 (on an FTE basis) (2024–2025)
- Staff: 188.29 FTE (2024–2025)
- Student–teacher ratio: 14.66 (2024–2025)

Other information
- Website: www.g-aschools.org

Galesburg-Augusta Community Schools is a public school district in Kalamazoo County, Michigan. It serves Galesburg, Augusta, and parts of the townships of Charleston, Comstock, Pavilion, and Ross.

== History ==
The Augusta school district, formerly separate from Galesburg, began sending its high school students to Galesburg High School around 1950 to help alleviate overcrowding. At the same time, the expansion of nearby Fort Custer reduced the property tax revenue available to Augusta schools. District residents also sought a greater role in the administration of the high school their students attended. In March 1951, voters approved a merger, and Galesburg-Augusta Community Schools was established on April 2, 1951.

Each town received a new elementary school in fall 1955. The Augusta Elementary was an addition to an earlier school, which was built in 1929. The 1929 section became a junior high.

The oldest section of Galesburg School had been built around 1860, and a more recent section was built in 1936. It was used as the district's high school until a new high school opened in fall 1961. The state fire marshal had condemned the old building but allowed the district to continue using it until the new high school was completed. The architect was Guido Binda and Associates of Kalamazoo.

A bond issue to build Galesburg-Augusta Middle School, then known as a junior high, was passed in September 1975. The previous middle school from 1929 was planned to be demolished when the new building opened in fall 1977. The architect was Adrian Noordhoek and Associates of Kalamazoo.

The current Galesburg-Augusta High School opened in fall 2003. The architect was Kingscott Associates. It was funded by a $21.67 million ($40.43 million in 2025 dollars) bond issue passed in 2000. A separate, concurrent bond issue to fund an auditorium failed to pass.

Prior to the opening of the district's Primary School, grades pre-kindergarten through three were in three separate buildings: East Primary (housed in the 1936 high school building), Central Primary, and West Primary Schools. They were so obsolete that they were considered a deterrent to enrollment by the superintendent. The former high school was renovated to house those grades, and it reopened in fall 2004.

In spring of 2010, the Galesburg-Augusta School Board voted to close the district's intermediate school, lowering the total number of buildings in the district to three. Fourth grade was moved to the Primary School, while fifth graders began attending the middle school.

A bond issue passed in 2021 funded classroom additions at the Primary School and new athletic fields and a multipurpose room at the high school.

== Athletics ==
The school has a variety of athletic teams. The school also offers clubs such as robotics, E-Sports, chess, and more.

The Galesburg-Augusta High School varsity football team won 4 Class D state championships in 1962, 1966, 1967, and in 1970. Head coach Bill Maskill was with the team over all 4 state championships, and had a total career record of 244-66-1. He later had a football stadium named after him that housed the football team until the 2024 season. A bond was passed in 2021 that replaced the old stadium and the new stadium was subsequently named after him following a ceremony in 2025. In 1990 the team returned to the state championships, held at the Pontiac Silverdome, but lost to Muskegon Catholic Central. More recently in the 2025 season, the team returned to the playoffs for the first time in the 21st century. However, they were defeated in the first round by Schoolcraft High school.

Other notable recent athletic achievements include the Galesburg-Augusta baseball team's conference championship in the 2025 season, as well as strong postseason runs by the women's volleyball team and women's basketball team in their respective district playoffs.

== Schools ==
Schools in Galesburg-Augusta Community Schools district
School	Address	Notes
Galesburg-Augusta High School	1076 N 37th St., Galesburg	Grades 9–12. Built 2003.
Galesburg-Augusta Middle School	750 W Van Buren St., Augusta	Grades 5–8.
Galesburg-Augusta Primary School	315 W Battle Creek St., Galesburg	Grades PreK-4. Built 1961.
Galesburg-Augusta Alternative Education	1076 N 37th St., Galesburg	Alternative school for grades 6–12 housed at Galesburg-Augusta High School.
