= 40th Infantry Regiment (United States) =

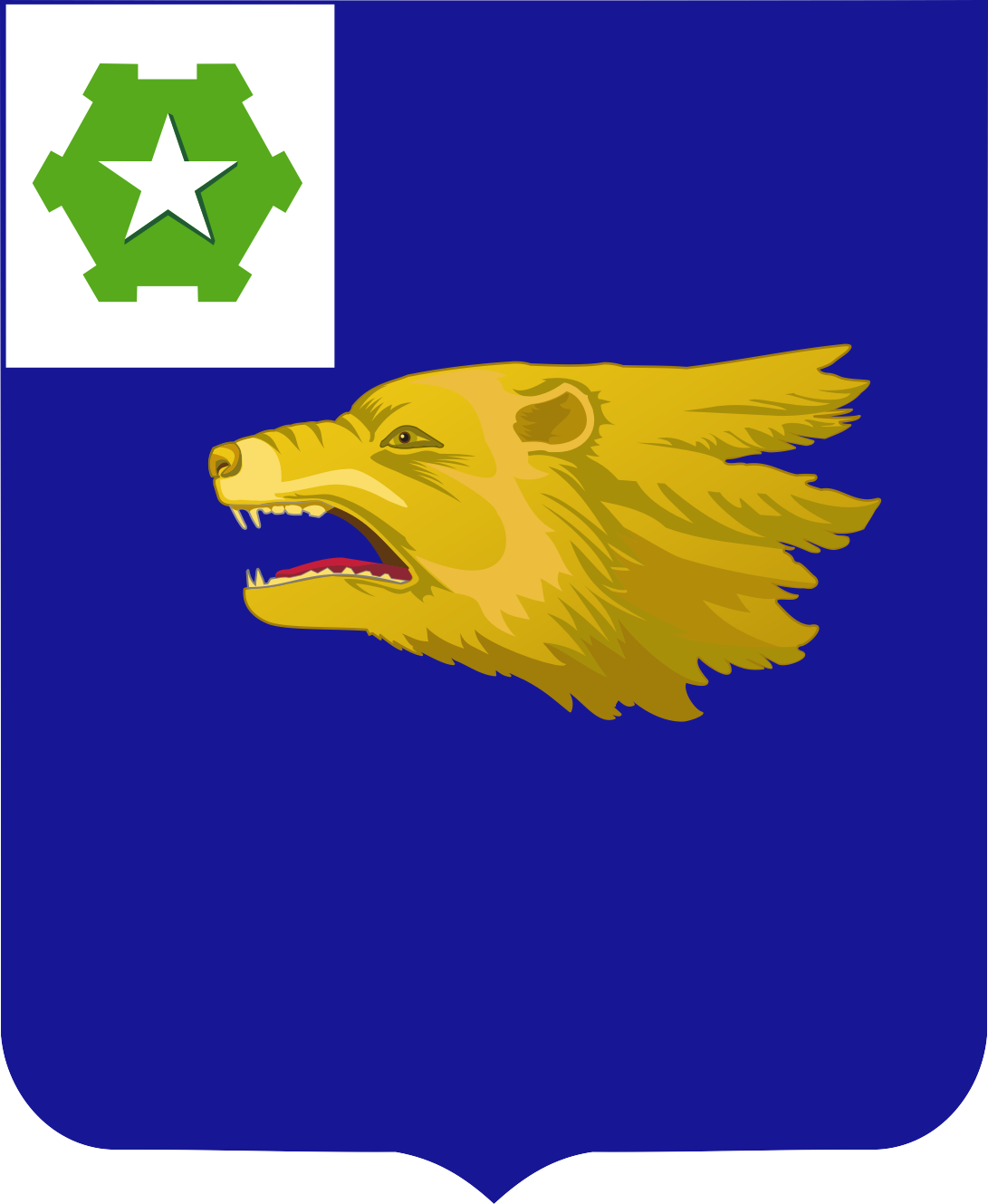
- Coat of arms
- Active: 1917–1944
- Country: United States
- Branch: United States Army
- Type: Infantry
- Motto: none

Insignia
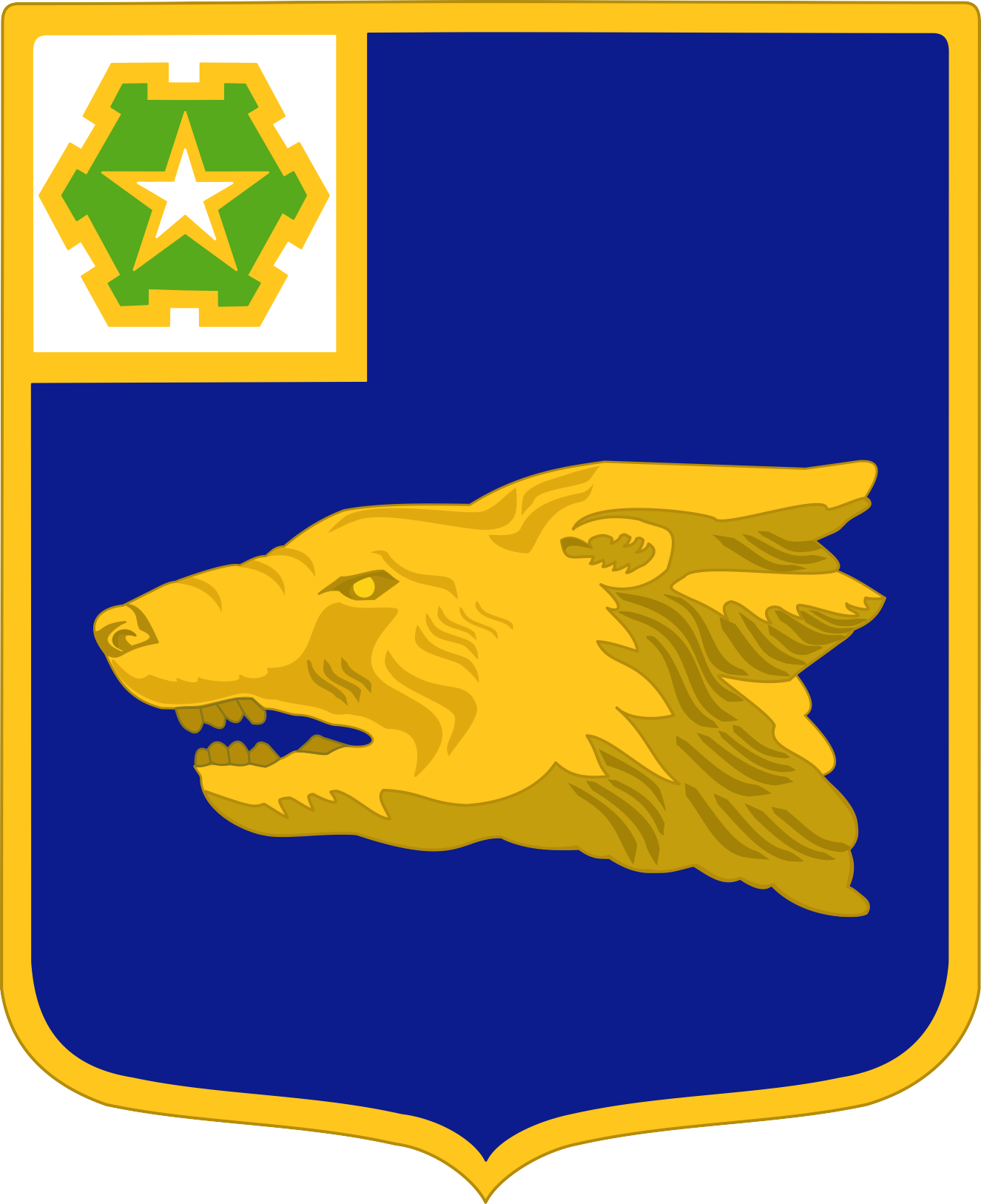
- Distinctive unit insignia

The 40th Infantry Regiment is an inactive infantry regiment in the United States Army.

== Lineage ==
=== World War I ===
The regiment was constituted on 15 May 1917 in the Regular Army as the 40th Infantry, and organized on 20 June 1917 at Fort Snelling, Minnesota, from personnel of the 36th Infantry Regiment. Colonel Joseph D. Leitch was assigned to command. The regiment was assigned to the 14th Division on 5 July 1918, and relieved from the 14th Division in February 1919.

=== Interwar period ===
The 40th Infantry was stationed at Camp Sherman, Ohio, as of June 1919 as a separate regiment. It was transferred on 27 June 1921 to Camp Knox, Kentucky. It was transferred on 3 September 1921 to St. Albans, West Virginia, to perform riot control during a coal miner's strike in Logan County. It was inactivated on 1 November 1921 at Danville, West Virginia, and allotted to the Third Corps Area; the 20th Infantry Regiment had been previously designated as Active Associate on 27 July 1921, which would provide the cadre to reactivate the 40th Infantry in the event of war. The personnel were concurrently transferred to the 10th and 11th Infantry Regiments. The 20th Infantry was relieved on 17 July 1922 as Active Associate and the 12th Infantry Regiment was designated as Active Associate. Assigned to the 8th Division on 24 March 1923. Organized 26 March 1926 with Organized Reserve personnel as a "Regular Army Inactive" (RAI) unit with headquarters at the U.S. Veterans Bureau building in Washington, D.C. Inactivated by relief of Reserve personnel on 24 November 1926. Withdrawn from the Third Corps Area on 28 February 1927 and allotted to the Second Corps Area. Concurrently, the 12th Infantry was relieved as Active Associate. Organized in June 1927 with Organized Reserve personnel as an RAI unit with headquarters at Ithaca, New York. Affiliated with the Cornell University ROTC program on 18 April 1930 and organized at Ithaca as an RAI unit with Regular Army personnel assigned to the ROTC detachment and Reserve officers commissioned from the program. Conducted summer training most years at Fort Niagara, New York, and some years at Camp Dix, New Jersey, or Plattsburg Barracks, New York. Relieved 1 July 1940 from the 8th Division. Disbanded 11 November 1944.

== Distinctive unit insignia ==
- Description

A Gold color metal and enamel device 1 1/4 inches (3.2 cm) in height consisting of a shield blazoned: Azure, the head of a wolverine erased Or; on a canton Argent a six-bastioned fort Vert charged with a mullet of the third (for the 36th Infantry).

- Symbolism

This Regiment was organized in 1917 from the 36th Infantry, shown by the canton. During World War I it was in the 14th Division, shown by the wolverine's head, the unofficial insignia of that Division.

- Background

The distinctive unit insignia was approved on 2 March 1938. It was rescinded on 5 September 1958.

== Coat of arms ==
- Blazon
  - Shield: Azure, the head of a wolverine erased Or; on a canton Argent a six-bastioned fort Vert charged with a mullet of the third (for the 36th Infantry).
  - Crest: None
  - Motto None
- Symbolism
  - Shield: This Regiment was organized in 1917 from the 36th Infantry, shown by the canton. During World War I it was in the 14th Division, shown by the wolverine's head, the unofficial insignia of that Division.
  - Crest: None
- Background: The coat of arms was approved on 29 June 1921. It was amended to correct the blazon on 23 March 1938. The insignia was rescinded on 5 September 1958.

== See also ==
- Distinctive unit insignia
