= Legacy of Parks =

1970s US conservation program

Legacy of Parks was a 1970s New Federalism style program promoted by the Nixon administration that turned federal land over to the states for historical, cultural and recreational purposes.

In 1972, the U.S. Congress appropriated $200 million from the Federal Land and Water Conservation Fund to support the program with the goal of conserving wild areas and saving the disappearing open spaces around the country's urban areas. Local governments were able to obtain 50–50 matching funds for new parks, playgrounds, and open spaces with priority given to the development and improvement of land already in public ownership. Special attention was given to projects that featured increasing the recreational use of the land.

The program's guiding principle was rooted on the idea that America's highly diversified population deserved a variety of natural areas to enjoy; from parks with modern conveniences to areas featuring the solitude of wilderness. Families, priests, casual tourists and avid outdoorsmen were viewed as having equal stakes in the parks.

To support the initiative, President Nixon asked for increases in funding for open space programs of the Department of Housing and Urban Development and established the Federal Property Review Board which evaluated federally owned land to determine if the parcels could be converted into parks.

By the late 1970s, over 700,000,000 acres of land had been purchased under the Legacy of Parks program. Playgrounds, forests, environmental education areas, bike trails, and jogging paths were all strong candidates for funding. Many of the urban sites were less than 20 acres (81,000 m^{2}). Some parks were larger such as Michigan's 3,000 acre Fort Custer Recreation Area or New York and New Jersey's 26,600 acre Gateway National Recreation Area.
