= Fort Custer Recreation Area =

Protected area in Kalamazoo County, Michigan, US

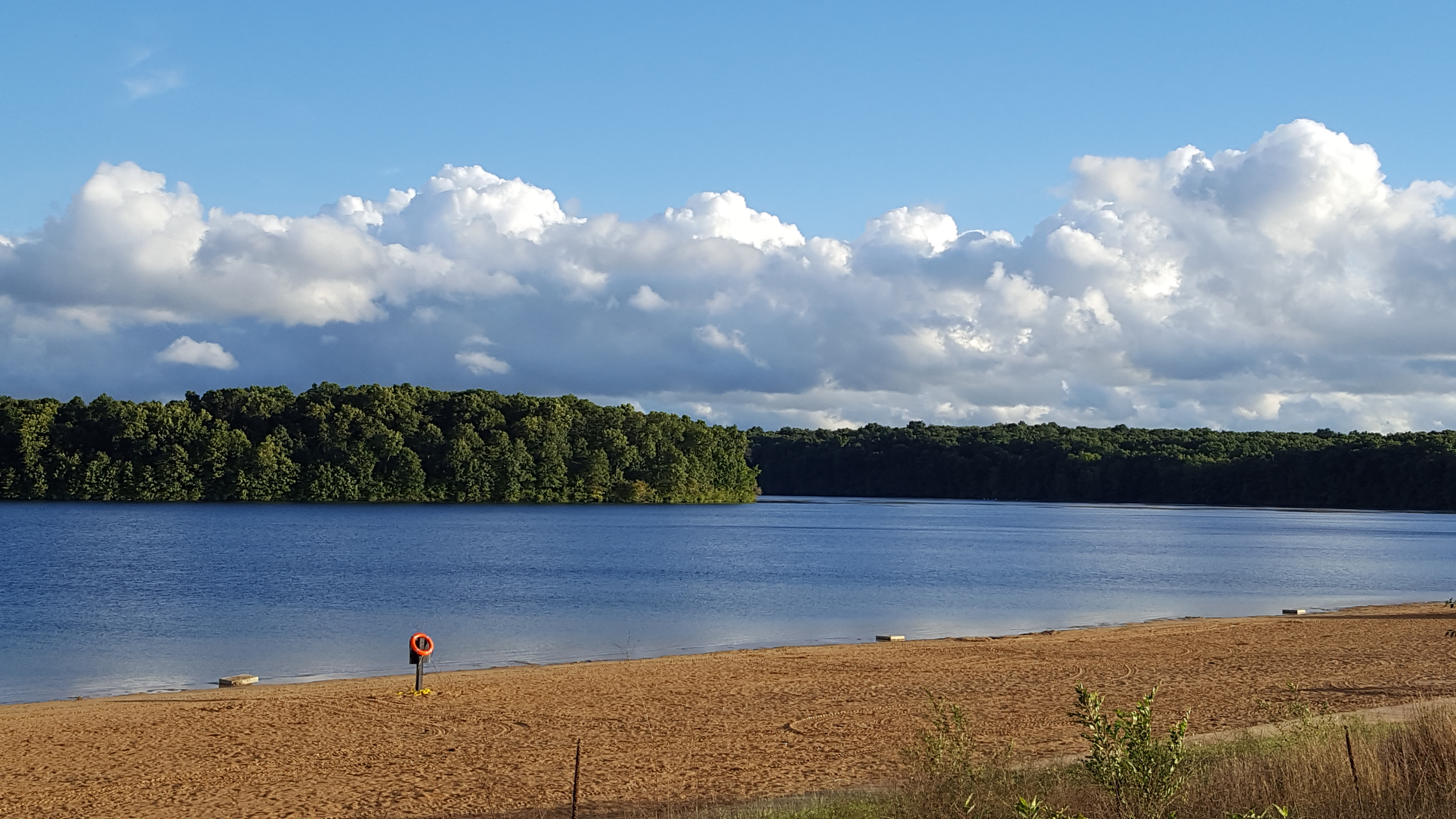
- Eagle Lake swimming beach

- Location within Michigan Location within the United States
- Location: Kalamazoo County, Michigan, US
- Nearest city: Augusta, Michigan
- Coordinates: 42°19′6″N 85°20′42″W
- Area: 3,033 acres (12.27 km^{2})
- Established: 1917
- Governing body: Michigan Department of Natural Resources
- Website: www.michigan.gov/recsearch/parks/FortCuster

Fort Custer Recreation Area is a 3,033-acre (12 km^{2}) Recreation Area located in Kalamazoo County, Michigan near Battle Creek. The area features 3 lakes, the Kalamazoo River, over 25 miles of multi-use trails, second growth oak barrens, and dry-mesic southern (oak-hickory) forests.

== History ==
The land was acquired in 1917 by the Federal Government and used as an induction and military training center for the US Army. Despite the history of military use that has taken place on and around the property, there was never a fort on the land. During World War II, the property was named Camp Custer. The Michigan Department of Natural Resources (DNR) acquired the land in 1971 as part of the Nixon administration's Legacy of Parks program. Today, the Fort Custer Training Center of the Michigan National Guard borders the recreation area.

In 1974, several ditches were modified and naturalized into creeks by the H. W. Kacey Company. The longest of these, which today is a naturally flowing stream, was named "Kacey's Creek," though that information has since been left off maps.

The trails were designed beginning in 1993 and were used for hiking, mountain biking, and horseback riding until trails were separated in November 2011. Over 15 miles of equestrian trails were added as well as a separate parking area.

== Facilities and activities ==
Fort Custer is a popular destination for hunting, mountain biking, camping, horseback riding, hiking, fishing, and dog mushing. The park has developed a set of trails for mountain biking, mushing, and hiking and a separate trail system for horseback riding and hiking. The trails surround each of the lakes: Eagle, Whitford, and Jackson Hole. Fort Custer Recreation Area also has a campground with 219 sites. Two of those sites are mini cabins. There is a camp office and small store where firewood, ice, and other convenience items may be purchased. The campsites vary in size; some are big enough for a tent, while a few can accommodate up to a 45-foot RV. All campsites have a fire ring and picnic table.

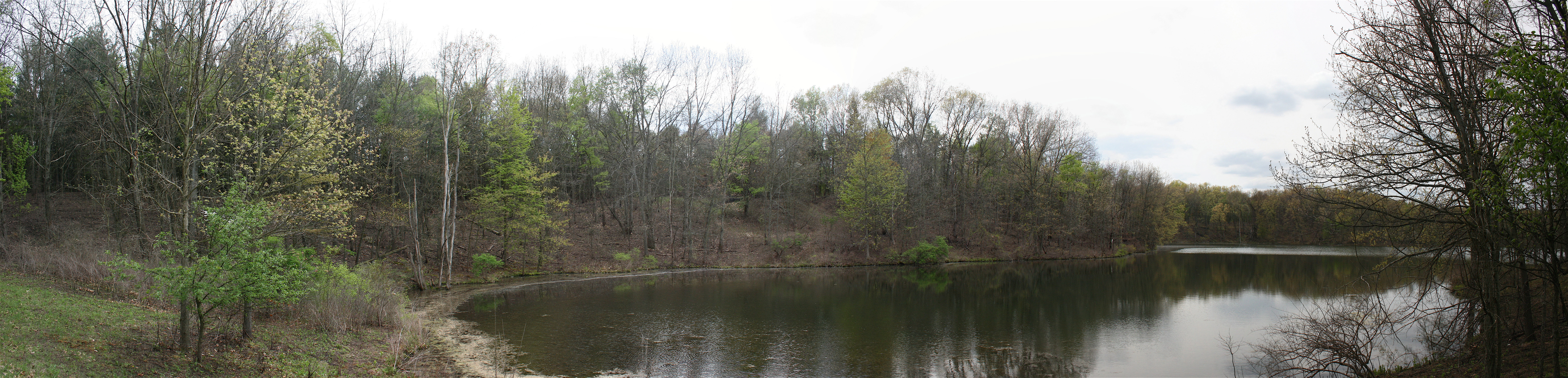
A view from "The Peninsula" stretch of the red trail on Eagle Lake

The Fort Custer mountain bike trails are divided into two levels of difficulty: blue being easy, green and red being difficult.

There is cross-country skiing in the winter. Mini cabins and rustic cabins are available for rent, one rustic cabin fronting the Kalamazoo River.

Fishing

There are three easily accessible lakes: Eagle Lake, Jackson Hole Lake, and Whitford-Lawler Lake. The Kalamazoo River also runs along the western of the park. Several types of panfish found within the area including bluegill (Lepomis macrochirus), pumpkinseed (Lepomis gibbosus), redbreast sunfish (Lepomis auritus) and yellow perch (Perca flavescens). There are a few species that are sought after as sport fish such as the largemouth bass (Micropterus salmoides) and smallmouth bass (Micropterus dolomieu). There are also abundant common carp (Cyprinus carpio) in Eagle Lake and the Kalamazoo River. During the winter ice fishers can often be seen on all three lakes.

== Wildlife ==
Because of the large amount of land and restoration projects in place at Fort Custer, there are countless species of plants and animals. Abundant water sources make Fort Custer a safe haven for many types waterfowl. Not only has the land become a safe haven for the waterfowl, but a safe haven for other threatened, near threatened and least-concern species of the area.

Birds

- American bittern, Botaurus lentiginosus
- Trumpeter swan. Cygnus buccinator
- Cooper's hawk, Accipiter cooperii
- Common moorhen, Gallinula chloropus
- Cerulean warbler, Dendroica cerulea
- Prothonotary warbler, Protonotaria citrea
- Louisiana waterthrush, Seiurus motacilla
- Hooded warbler, Wilsonia citrina
- Grasshopper sparrow, Ammodramus savannarum
- Henslow's sparrow, Ammodramus henslowii
- Wild turkey, Meleagris gallopavo

Reptiles

- Eastern box turtle, Terrapene carolina carolina

Amphibians

- Blanchard's cricket frog, Acris crepitans blanchardi

Plants

- Leadplant, Amorpha canescens
- White false indigo, Baptisia alba
- Yellow harlequin, Corydalis flavula
- Downy sunflower, Helianthus mollis
- False boneset, Kuhnia eupatorioides

== Getting there ==
Fort Custer Recreation Area is located north of Interstate 94 between Battle Creek and Kalamazoo, Michigan at exits 85 or 92. The park is east of Augusta on M-96.

== See also ==
- Fort Custer Training Center
