= Fort Custer Training Center =

Michigan Army National Guard facility in the US

Fort Custer
- Kalamazoo County, outside of Augusta, Michigan, 4 miles west of downtown Battle Creek
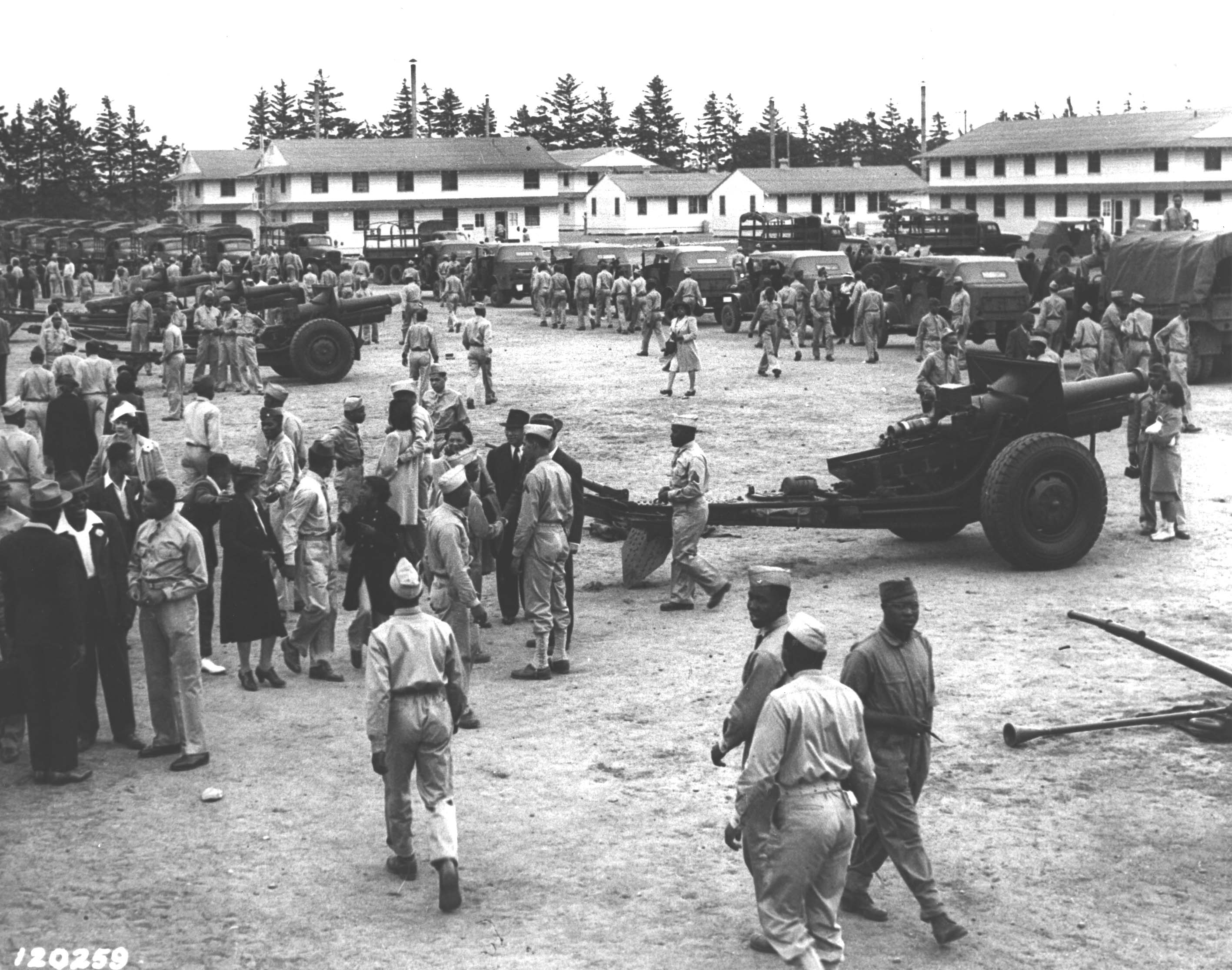
- 184th Field Artillery at Ft. Custer (June 1941)

Site information
- Type: Army post
- Controlled by: United States

Location
- Coordinates: 42°17′33″N 85°19′33″W

Site history
- Built: 1917
- In use: 1917–present
- Battles/wars: none

Garrison information
- Past commanders: William H. Hay; LTC Dennis Nadrasik
- Garrison
- Camp Custer Veterans Administration Hospital--United States Veterans Hospital No. 100
- U.S. National Register of Historic Places
- Location: 5500 Armstrong Rd., Battle Creek, Michigan
- Area: 206 acres (83 ha)
- Built by: Construction Service-VA
- Architect: Quartermaster Corps-US Army;
- Architectural style: Colonial Revival, Classical Revival
- MPS: United States Second Generation Veterans Hospitals MPS
- NRHP reference No.: 12000282
- Added to NRHP: May 17, 2012

Fort Custer Training Center, often known simply as Fort Custer, is a federally owned and state-operated Michigan Army National Guard training facility, but is also used by other branches of the armed forces and armed forces from Illinois, Indiana, and Ohio. It is one of the most heavily used Midwest training facilities and is used mainly for company level small arms and maintenance training.

Fort Custer occupies land in both Kalamazoo County, Michigan, to the west and Calhoun County, Michigan, to the east. Most Fort facilities are located north or south of M-96 about four miles (6.4 km) west of Battle Creek, Michigan, in Calhoun County, and two miles (3.2 km) east of Augusta, Michigan, in Kalamazoo County. This locates the Fort about 14 miles (23 km) east of the town of Kalamazoo, Michigan, and mostly south of M-96, and divided east–west by the Kalamazoo and Calhoun county line that runs north and south.

The current Fort Custer Training Center is located south of M-96 and mostly east of the county line at 2501 26th St., Battle Creek, Michigan 49037. The Battle Creek VA Medical Center is located north of M-96 in northwest Calhoun County at 5500 Armstrong Rd., Battle Creek, Michigan 49037. Fort Custer National Cemetery is located north of M-96 in Kalamazoo County, about two miles east of Augusta, Michigan, at 15501 Dickman Rd., Augusta, Michigan Fort Custer Recreation Area is located on the south side of M-96 in Kalamazoo County, at 5163 Fort Custer Dr., Augusta, Michigan 49012.

== History ==
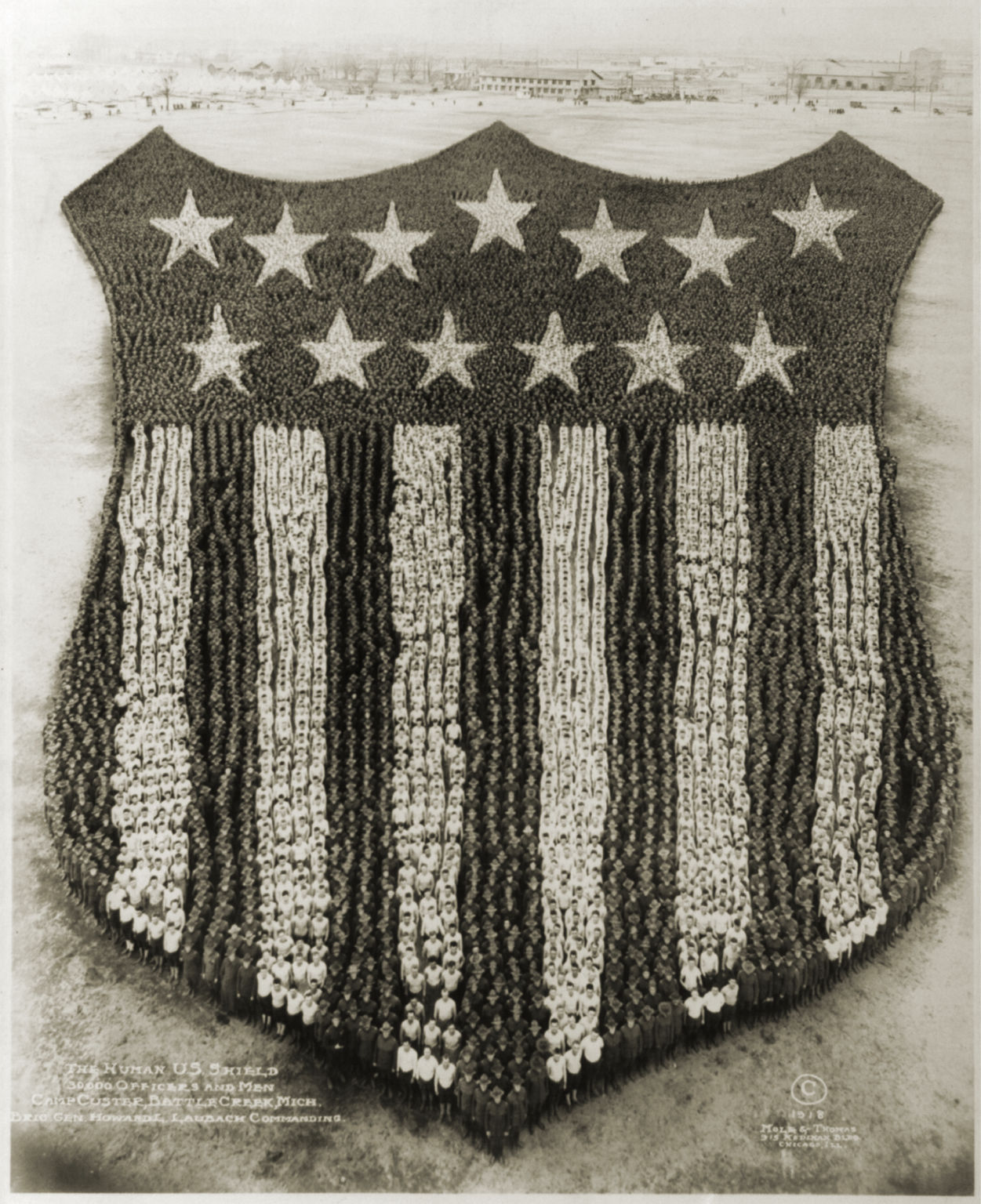
"The Human U.S. Shield", 30,000 officers and men, at Camp Custer, Michigan, World War I (1918)

Camp Custer was built in 1917 for military training during World War I and named after Civil War cavalry officer General George Armstrong Custer. The facility and its 160th Depot Brigade trained or demobilized more than 100,000 troops during World War I, including 5,000 for Polar Bear Expedition as part of the Allied intervention in the Russian Civil War. In 1917 and early 1918, the brigade and the camp were commanded by Samuel W. Miller.

The camp was designed and built by civil engineer Samuel Arnold Greeley in just a few months to handle 35,000 men.

The camp was also used to train the 14th Infantry "Wolverine" Division.

In the years following World War I, the camp was used to train the Officer Reserve Corps and the Civilian Conservation Corps.

=== World War II ===
On August 17, 1940, Camp Custer was designated Fort Custer and became a permanent military training base. During World War II, the post had an area of 16,005 Acres, and Quarters for 1,279 Officers and 27,553 Enlisted Personnel. More than 300,000 troops trained there, including the 5th Infantry Division (also known as the "Red Diamond Division") which was sent to Iceland in 1942 to protect the North Atlantic convoy routes, and in 1944 landed in France shortly after D-Day. The division saw much combat and sustained heavy casualties, particularly at the Battle of Metz. In 1943, Fort Custer was the activation point for many Army inductees from Chicago, Illinois and other parts of the midwest. New troops received their equipment before being sent by train to Basic Training or other duty assignments. The primary purpose of the camp was to function as a Military Police Replacement Training Center. Fort Custer also served as a prisoner of war camp for 5,000 German soldiers until 1945.

=== Cold War ===
Fort Custer became home to units of the Navy Reserve in 1949 and to a Marine Corps Reserve Tactical Bridge Company in 1952. Also during that time, approximately 17,000 troops were trained for the Korean War and Fort Custer served as an induction center for draftees. Beginning in 1959, Fort Custer served for a decade as part of the North American Air Defense system. In 1968, the state of Michigan took over operation of the base although it remains federally owned.

=== Current uses ===
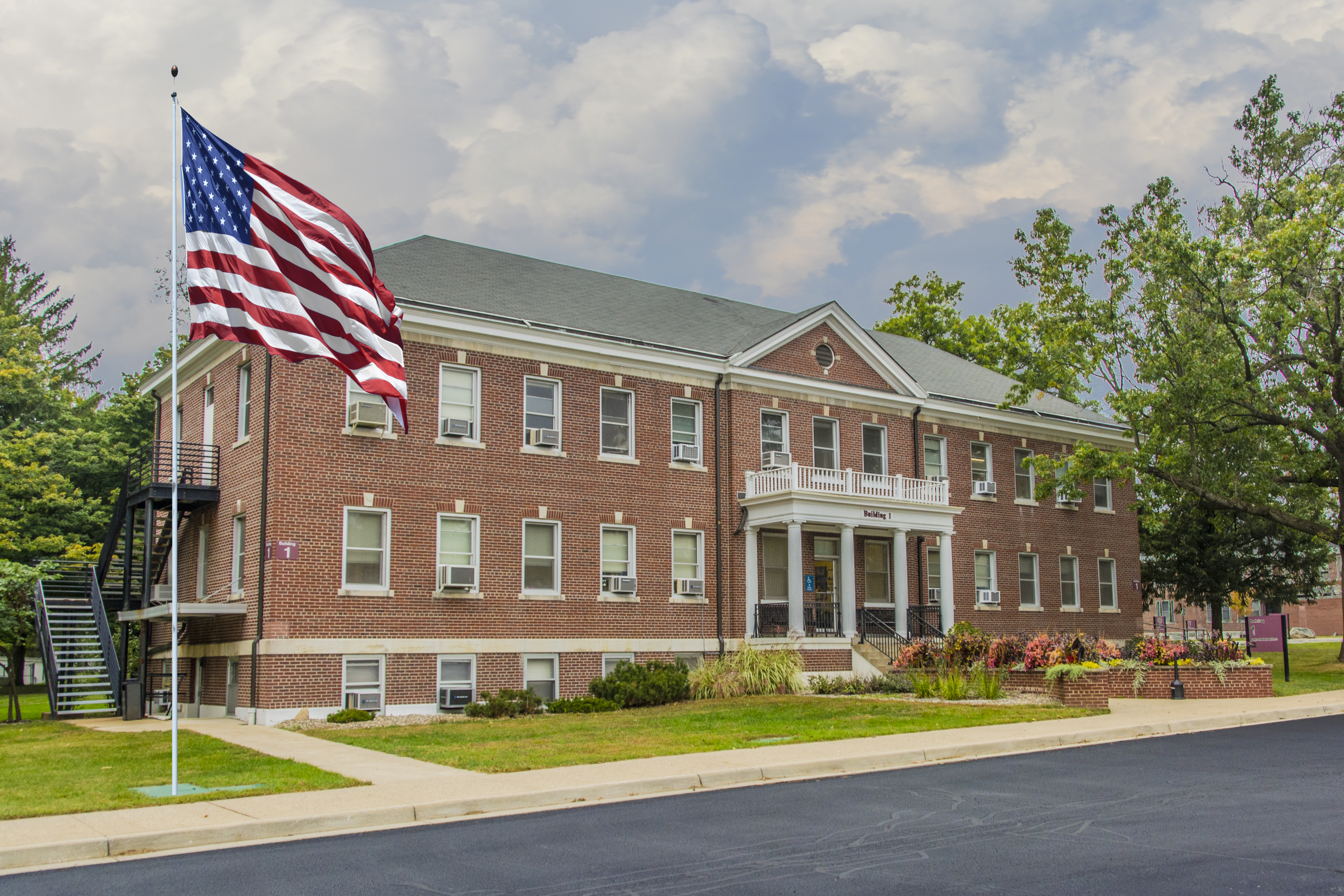
BCVA Building

Fort Custer's facilities are used by the Michigan National Guard and other branches of the armed forces (including ROTC students), primarily from Ohio, Illinois, and Indiana. The 177th Regiment, Regional Training Institute, Augusta Armory and the Regional Maintenance Training Site are based at Fort Custer. Additionally FBI, the Michigan State Police, and other law enforcement agencies have used the area.

Fort Custer offers a distance learning center, barracks and dining facilities for visiting units, and plenty of training areas. The small arms ranges are recently upgraded and the maneuver training areas offer a variety of terrain.

ROTC cadets use Fort Custer for their bi-annual CFTXs (Combined Field Training Exercises). These exercises consist of day and night land navigation, and Situational Tactical Exercise (STX) lanes. Cadets are placed into squads with other cadets from different schools, and graded on their performances.

Fort Custer is currently being looked at as the location of a proposed Eastern United States missile defense site.

The U.S. Navy Reserve's Navy Operational Support Center Battle Creek is located in the northeast portion of the facility. It provides administrative, training, and medical support to 270 Michigan and Indiana reserve Sailors in 13 units and is staffed by 14 Full-Time Support Sailors.

== Non-military uses ==
Established during World War I and greatly expanded during World War II, the base reached a size of over 14,000 acres (57 km^{2}). After the wars, the size of the base was reduced. In 1923, 675 acres (2.73 km^{2}) were transferred for the Battle Creek Veterans Affairs hospital.

The hospital received casualties from Europe. During and immediately following WWII, the Fort Custer Veterans Affairs Hospital served primarily for the in-patient medical care and therapy of amputees. WWII war veteran amputees living in Michigan refused to return to Fort Custer for any reason, as they continued to have nightmares of the hospital; they spoke of tracks along the ceilings of the buildings as well as the long hallways that linked the various hospital buildings together, and of all the amputees sitting on slings suspended from the ceiling tracks as they were pushed from room to room and building to building. The Fort Custer Veterans Affairs Hospital is best known today for providing out-patient and, more particularly, in-patient care for male and female veterans with Post Traumatic Stress.

The extensive grounds included a 200-acre (0.81 km^{2}) working farm for vocational therapy

The 3,000-acre (12 km^{2}) Fort Custer Recreation Area is a state park adjoining the Fort, donated from base land in 1971. It includes 22 miles (35 km) of hiking trails, 20 miles (32 km) of mountain bike trails and 16 miles (26 km) of bridle trails. There is cross-country skiing in the winter. Mini cabins and rustic cabins are available for rent. The park is just east of Augusta on M-96.

Battle Creek Unlimited built Fort Custer industrial park containing over ninety businesses which provide over 8,000 jobs. It was developed on base land in the 1970s and lies between the Fort Custer Military Reserve and W. K. Kellogg Airport (civilian and Air National Guard). Goods produced include shopping carts, noodles, fiber optic, traffic signals, automotive parts, water purification pumps, and instruments for microscopic study of surgical specimens. A master plan was developed and implemented. "The charge to retain, develop and attract employers led to resounding success in Fort Custer Industrial Park, at 3,000 acres the largest modern industrial park in Michigan."

The 770-acre (3.1 km^{2}) Fort Custer National Cemetery lies on land from Fort Custer and the VA Medical Center. The United States Department of Veterans Affairs indicates that as of September 30, 1999, the cemetery had 11,955 total burials. During FY 1999 (Oct 98-Sept 99) there were 1,112 burials. The VA estimates Fort Custer National Cemetery has sufficient space to continue providing full casket gravesites beyond the year 2030.

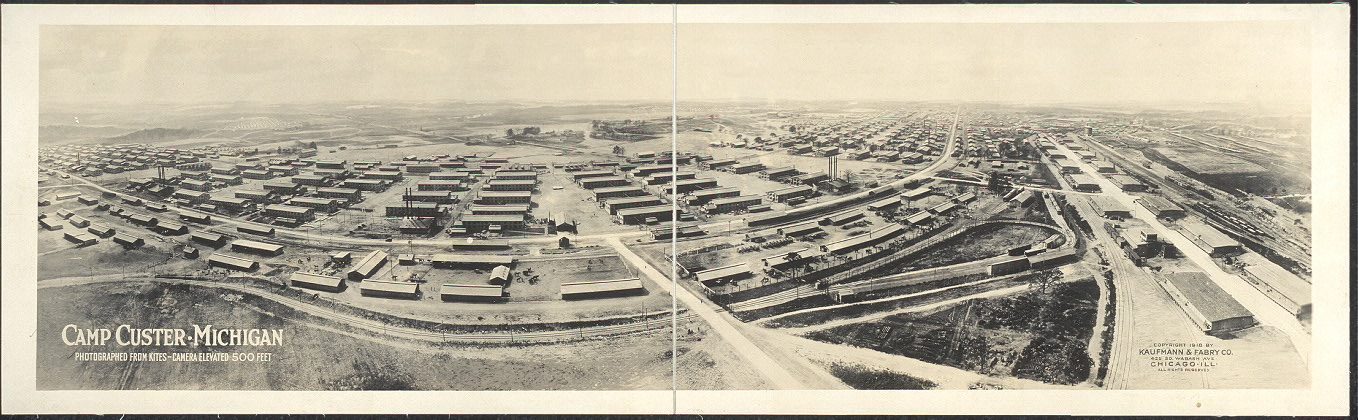
World War I aerial view of Fort Custer

== See also ==
- 728th Military Police Battalion
- Fort Custer Recreation Area
