= List of mayors of Kalamazoo, Michigan =

This is a list of mayors of the city of Kalamazoo.

List of mayors of Kalamazoo, Michigan
#	Image	Term	Mayor
1		1884	Allen Potter
2		1885	Edwin W. DeYoe
3		1886-1887	Peyton Ranney
4		1887-1889	Otto Ihling
5		1890	William E. Hill
6		1891	Frederick Bush
7		1892	William E. Hill
8		1893-1894	James W. Osborn
9		1895	Otto Ihling
10		1896	James Monroe
11		1897-1898	Allan M. Stearns
12		1899	William G. Howard
13		1900-1901	Alfred J. Mills
14		1902	Edmond S. Rankin
15		1903	Samuel Folz
16		1904	James W. Osborn
17		1905	Walter R. Taylor
18		1906-1907	William Thompson
19		1908-1909	Frank H. Milham
20		1910-1911	Charles H. Farrell
21		1912	Charles B. Hays
22		1913-1914	Alfred B. Connable
23		1915-1917	James B. Balch
24		1918	William E. Upjohn
25		1919-1920	Albert J. Todd
26		1921-1923	Cornelius Verburg
27		1923-1927	George K. Taylor
28		1927-1928	Ernest A. Balch
29		1928-1929	Edward M. Kennedy
30		1929-1931	S. Rudolph Light
31		1931-1933	Lewis C. Wright
32		1933-1935	William Shakespeare, Jr.
33		1935-1937	Paul H. Todd
34		1937-1939	Arthur L. Blakeslee
35		1939-1941	Frank E. McAllister
36		1941-1943	Lou W. Collins
37		1943-1945	Louis W. Sutherland
38		1945-1949	Henry Ford, Jr.
39		1949-1951	Paul H. Todd
40		1951-1959	Glenn S. Allen, Jr.
41		1959-1961	James S. Gilmore, Jr.
42		1961-1963	Paul E. Morrison
43		1963-1967	Raymond L. Hightower
44		1967-1969	Paul J. Schrier
45		1969-1971	Francis P. Hamilton
46		1971-1973	Gilbert H. Bradley, Jr.
47		1973-1979	Francis P. Hamilton
48		1979-1981	Edward J. Annen, Jr.
49		1981-1983	Caroline R. Ham
50		1983-1985	Francis P. Hamilton
51		1985-1991	Edward J. Annen, Jr.
52		1991-1993	Beverly A. Moore
53		1993-1995	Edward A. Annen, Jr.
54		1995-1997	Barbara A. Larson
55		1997-2005	Robert B. Jones
56		2005-2007	Hannah McKinney
57		2007-2019	Bobby Hopewell
58		2019-	David Anderson
