= Hannah McKinney =

American politician

Hannah [McKinney] Apps is the former vice-mayor and mayor of Kalamazoo, Michigan. She was elected mayor on November 8, 2005, after previously serving since 1997 as the vice-mayor under the late Robert Jones. Apps was mayor at the time that the Kalamazoo Promise was announced, and was also mayor when Kalamazoo's Intermodal Center was dedicated. Bobby J. Hopewell was elected mayor on November 13, 2007, edging Apps by just 54 votes. She automatically became vice mayor. Apps served eight terms on the Kalamazoo City Commission before deciding not to run again in 2011. She served as a city planning commissioner prior to her election to the city commission. She is also a full professor of economics at Kalamazoo College and is the Thomas K. Kreilick Professor of Economics and Business.

Apps received her Ph.D. in economics at the University of Pennsylvania. She has been teaching at Kalamazoo College since 1989. Her focus is in urban economics, urban planning, and public finance. She has also written a book entitled The Development of Local Public Services, 1650–1869: Lessons from Middletown, CT., published by Greenwood Press, 1995. She has also written several articles on the topics of urban planning and public finance. Apps has two children, Charlie and Maggie, a grandson, Aiden, and has been married to Gary Apps since 2014.
