= Park Trades Center =

Coordinates: 42°17′41.58″N 85°35′11.06″W

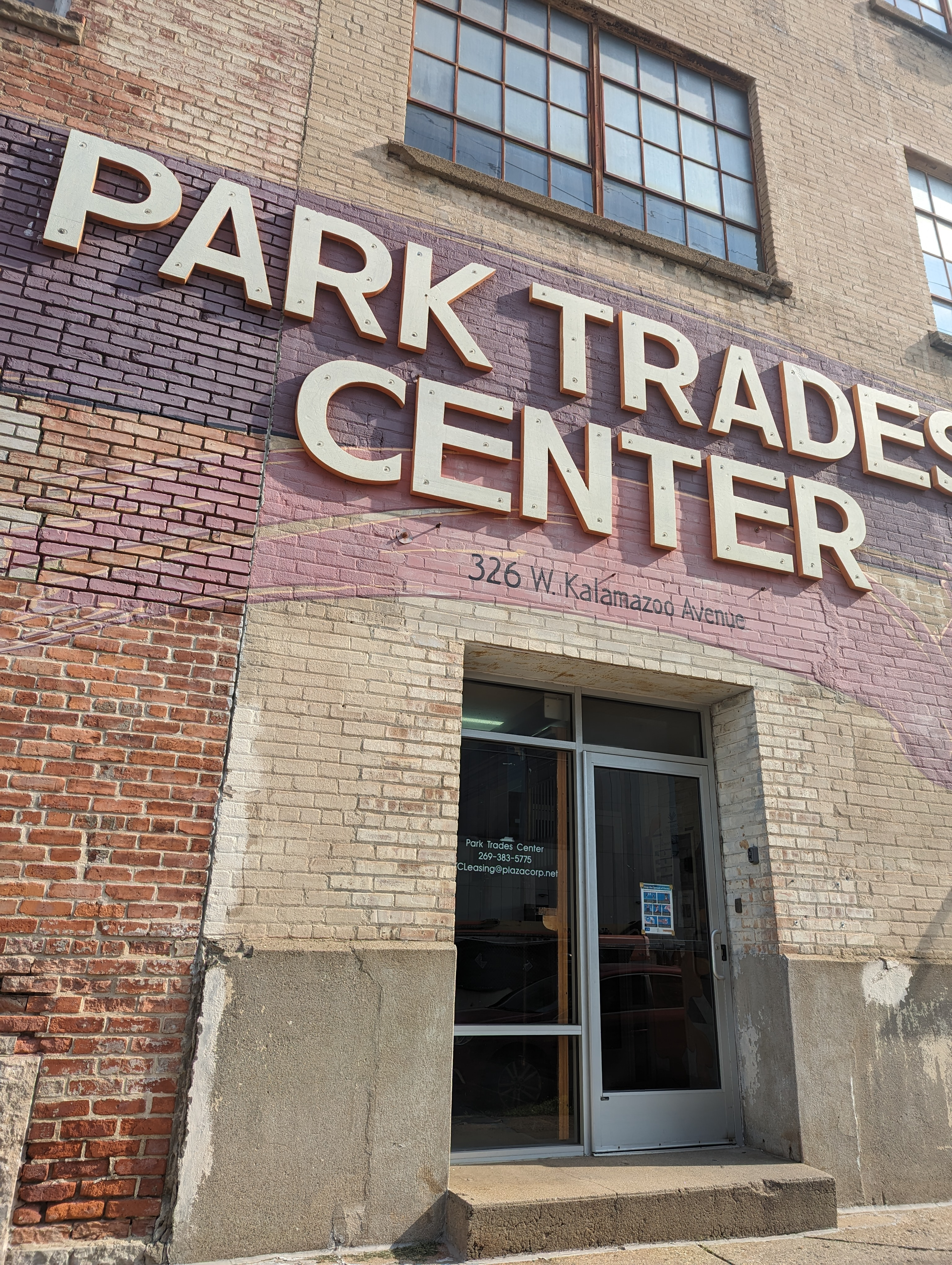
Park Trades Center, Kalamazoo Ave. entrance

The Park Trades Center is an arts center located at 326 W. Kalamazoo Ave in Kalamazoo, Michigan, United States. Originally a manufacturing faculty, the building was repurposed and began to attract artists in the 1970s, and now houses artist studios and arts organizations. Occupants have included Glass Arts Kalamazoo and the Kalamazoo Book Arts Center, as well as studios dedicated to blacksmithing, cabinetmaking, glassblowing, ceramics, photography and other mediums. The center is a popular location to visit during Kalamazoo's Art Hop, a regular event sponsored by the Arts Council of Greater Kalamazoo.

== History ==
Built in the early 1900s, the building opened in 1906 and was originally home to the Kalamazoo Loose Leaf Binder Co., and the Saniwax Paper Co., with "Saniwax Building" still visible on the exterior brick structure. In 1982 the property was purchased, repurposed, and renamed as the Park Trades Center.

On October 27th, 1993, American rock band Nirvana and Rolling Stone magazine conducted a photo shoot at the Park Trades Center the evening before Nirvana's concert at Wings Stadium. One of the resulting photos - a black and white up-close shot of Kurt Cobain's face, would be used as the cover of Rolling Stone shortly after his death by suicide on April 5th, 1994.
