= Kalamazoo Civic Theatre =

Community theater company in Kalamazoo, Michigan

The Kalamazoo Civic Theatre is a community theater company located in Kalamazoo, Michigan.

== Venues ==
The Kalamazoo Civic Theatre has three performance venues.

=== Civic Auditorium ===
Opened in 1931, the Civic Auditorium is located at 329 S. Park Street. The auditorium has a single balcony and seats about 500.

=== Parish Theatre ===
Opened in 1998, the Parish Theatre is located at 426 S. Park Street. A black box-style theater, seats 175.

=== Carver Center Studio ===
The studio is located on the second floor of the Carver Center Complex, at 426 S. Park Street. Renovated in 2017.

== History ==
The Kalamazoo Civic Players was established in 1929 and first performed on the stage of the Lincoln School Auditorium. Founders of the theatre included Dorothy Dalton, Norman Carver Sr., Howard Chenery, Ruth Noble, Paul Fuller, Louise Carver, and Jean Huston.

=== Timeline ===
1931 – The Players move into the Civic Auditorium on Park Street, a gift of W.E. Upjohn to the city. The theatre was state of the art for the time. In October of that year, their first show of the 1931–1932 season was a staging of W. Somerset Maugham's "The Constant Wife".

1933 – Founding member Norman Carver Sr. was instrumental in forming the Michigan Little Theatre Enclave, later to become the Community Theatre Association of Michigan.

1941 – The Civic was asked by the publishers of Stage Magazine to present a production of one of their plays on Broadway.

1945 – An intern program was created. It was the first of its kind in the nation. The first intern was Betty Ebert, who later married Jack Ragotzy. Together they founded The Barn Theatre in Augusta, Michigan.

1945 – In order to support the war effort, the Civic began touring productions to outlying communities. This outreach program was an important part of the Civic's mission during the war years.

1949 – The "Imaginary Invalid" was staged in an arena style setting. Audience members sat on the stage, surrounding the action. This venture gave a hint of what was to come with the Carver Center.

1950 – The Civic staged its 200th production "The Madwoman of Chaillot".

1952 – Norman Carver was elected as the inaugural president of the newly created National Organization of Community Theatres.

1953 – The Civic celebrated its 25th anniversary.

1956 – The tradition of opening the season with a musical began a tradition that continues to this day.

1958 – The Civic Auditorium Trustees built an annex to the auditorium. This new facility, built one block south of the auditorium, was needed to give the players much needed shop and storage space. It also provided a multi purpose space that was used as a second performance area for experimental productions. It also was used as office and rehearsal space for the Kalamazoo Symphony Orchestra. The trustees honored their manager of 30 years, Norman Carver, by naming the facility after him.

1958 – James Carver joined The Civic staff as a Production Assistant.

1960 – The Civic was the first community theatre in the nation to present "Raisin in the Sun".

1969 – The Civic entered its first AACT festival. Due to an accident during the performance they were unable to complete their performance. However, because of the quality of the performance they were given an Honorary Mention.

1974 – James Carver was promoted to managing director of The Civic.

1983 – "Fools", having won first place in State and Regional AACT/Fest competition, went on to represent The Civic at the National Festival. It was voted second place in National Competition. This Civic production represented the United States at an international theatre festival in England.

1989 – The Civic presented its 500th production "Our Town".

1994 – The Civic produced "Dancing at Lughnasa". This was another festival entrant, winning State, Regional, and National Competitions. They also received recognition for both the outstanding performance of the actors as well as design of the production.

1995 – A Capital Campaign was undertaken to fund a complete renovation of the Civic Auditorium as well as the construction of the Suzanne D. Parish Theatre. New electrical systems, rigging, stage flooring, and seating were installed in the auditorium as part of the renovation. Furnishings were reupholstered, and the walls were repainted.

1996 – Ground breaking took place for the new Suzanne D. Parish Theatre. It was built next to the Carver Center.

1997 – The Civic took "Dancing at Lughnasa" to Monaco to perform at an international festival sponsored by the Princess Grace Foundation.

1997 – James Carver retired from the Civic.

1998 – August 1998 brought the opening of a multi-million-dollar state of the art arena style performance space. In addition it doubled the shop space as well as giving the ever-growing Civic much needed storage space.

1999 – The Civic's production of "Forever Plaid" won first place in State and Regional AACT/Fest competition. The "Plaid" company represented Michigan, Indiana, Illinois, Wisconsin, and Ohio at National competition in Memphis, Tennessee.

2000 - The Kalamazoo Civic Players and the Kalamazoo Civic Auditorium merged to form the Kalamazoo Civic Theatre.

2003 - The Civic's production of "Visiting Mr. Green" won first place in AACT/Fest competition and traveled to Wisconsin.

2004 - The Civic celebrated its 75th anniversary with a Gala Reunion Concert, which featured former volunteers that have gone on to careers in regional theatre, film, and opera as well as on Broadway and television.

2005 – The Carver Center was expanded to include a new costume shop as well as new rehearsal and classroom space.

2005 – The Civic hosted AACTFest 2005, the national theatre festival. Over 500 theatre lovers traveled to Kalamazoo to see community theatre productions, attend workshops and make new friends.

2005 – The Civic launched its Senior Class Reader's Theatre program with a semi-staged production of Ladies of the Corridor. The SCRT is composed of veteran performers (age 50 and older) who perform learned, but not memorized, lines.

2006 – As part of the newly created Artist-in-Residence program, Broadway performers Ron Schwinn, Jerry Dixon, Peg Small and acclaimed author Alma Bond shared their skills and insights with the Civic staff, guest artists and volunteers. They also played an important role in community outreach, teaching classes and leading group discussion.

2007 – The theatre was chosen as the first community theatre in the country to present a pilot production of the Tony Award-winning musical "Avenue Q". Naughty and fun, this provocative show broke all attendance records for the Parish Theatre.

== About ==
Each year, the Civic season includes both musicals and plays, set in either the Main Stage, or the Parish Theatre. The Civic has been unusual in its ability to maintain both a professional core staff, and a very enthusiastic community involvement. The professional staff has provided a foundation for the consistently high quality of their productions. In addition, there is a great deal of other theatrical activity in the area, leading to the availability of a large number of experienced amateur actors who repeatedly make their appearance on the Civic's stages.

The Civic Youth Theatre is also an important group in Kalamazoo County. It does three shows a year. The Civic's Youth Education Program is strong and offers camps throughout the summer to encourage today's youth to become tomorrow's leaders in the arts.

The front of the auditorium was designed utilizing elements reminiscent of a circus tent. The carving around the doorways gives the impression of tent flaps. Built in 1929 the Auditorium features a house capable of seating 500, eccrouetements of imported limestone, and lead crystal chandeliers imported from Yugoslavia. The Auditorium stage features 40 usable flysets. The proscenium measures 30 feet across and stage depth is 32 feet.

A remarkable feature of the Civic is the Parish theatre, completed in 1998. This is a black-box-type theatre complete with a trapdoor and possibly all way around seating.
