= Kalamazoo, Michigan =

City in the United States

- City
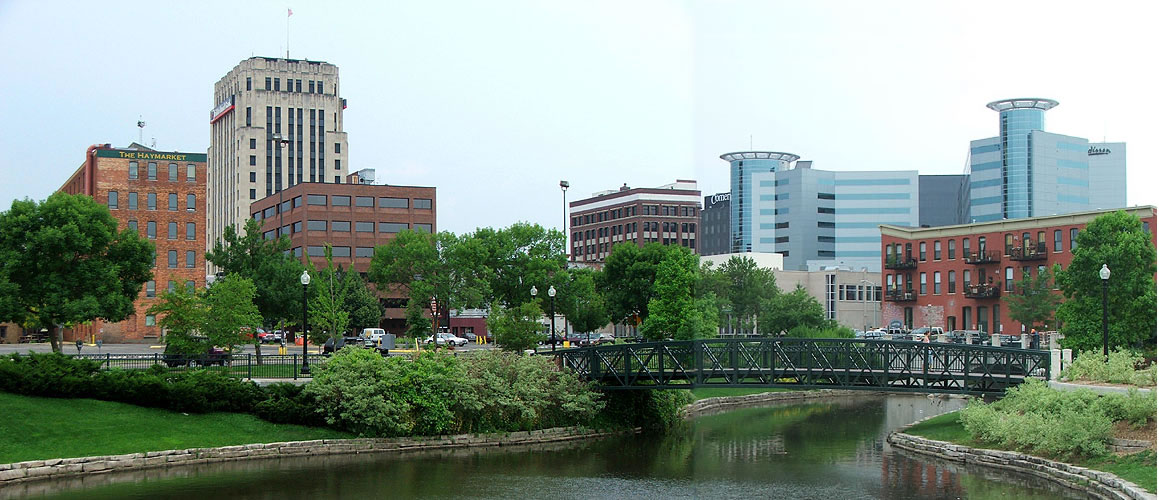
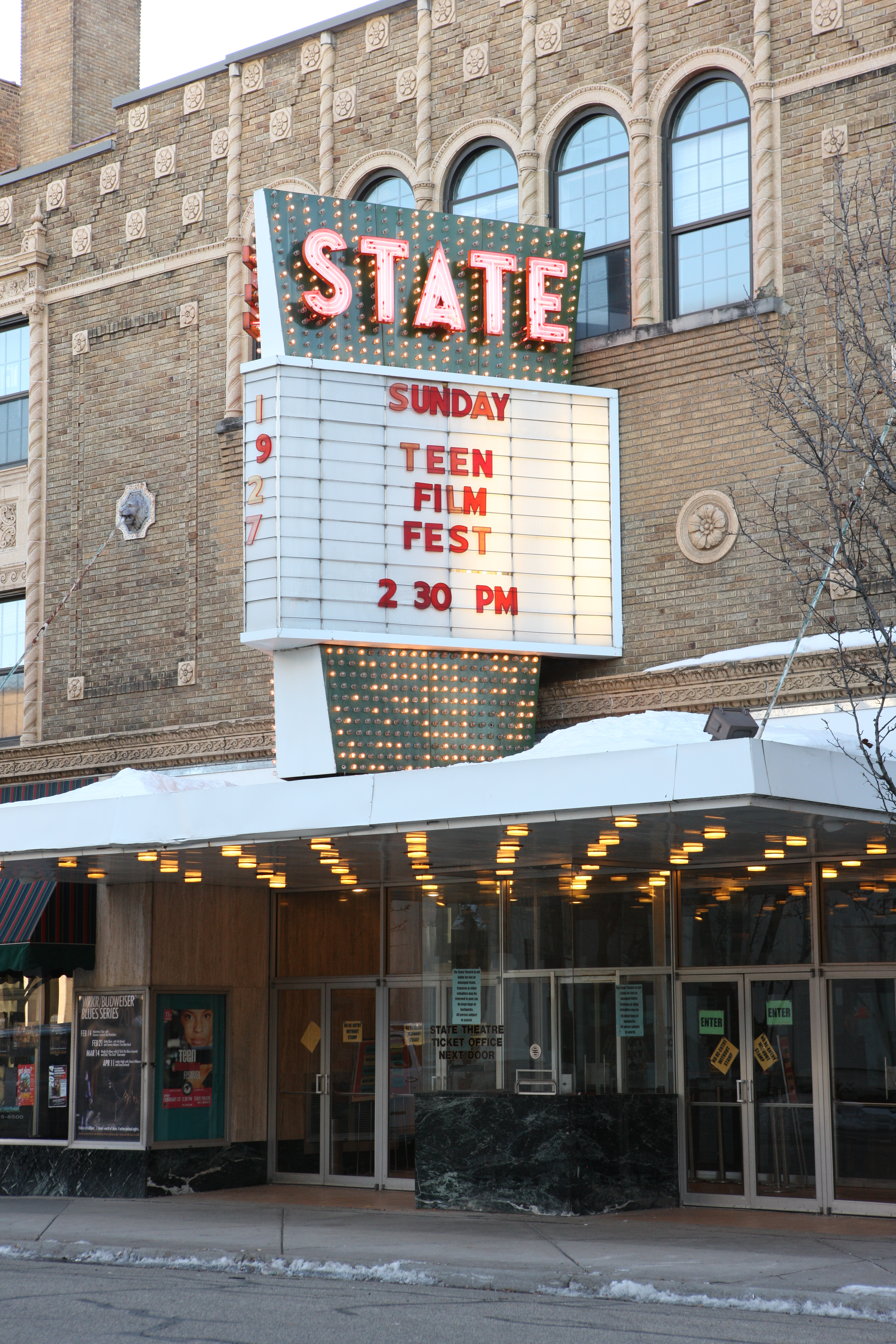
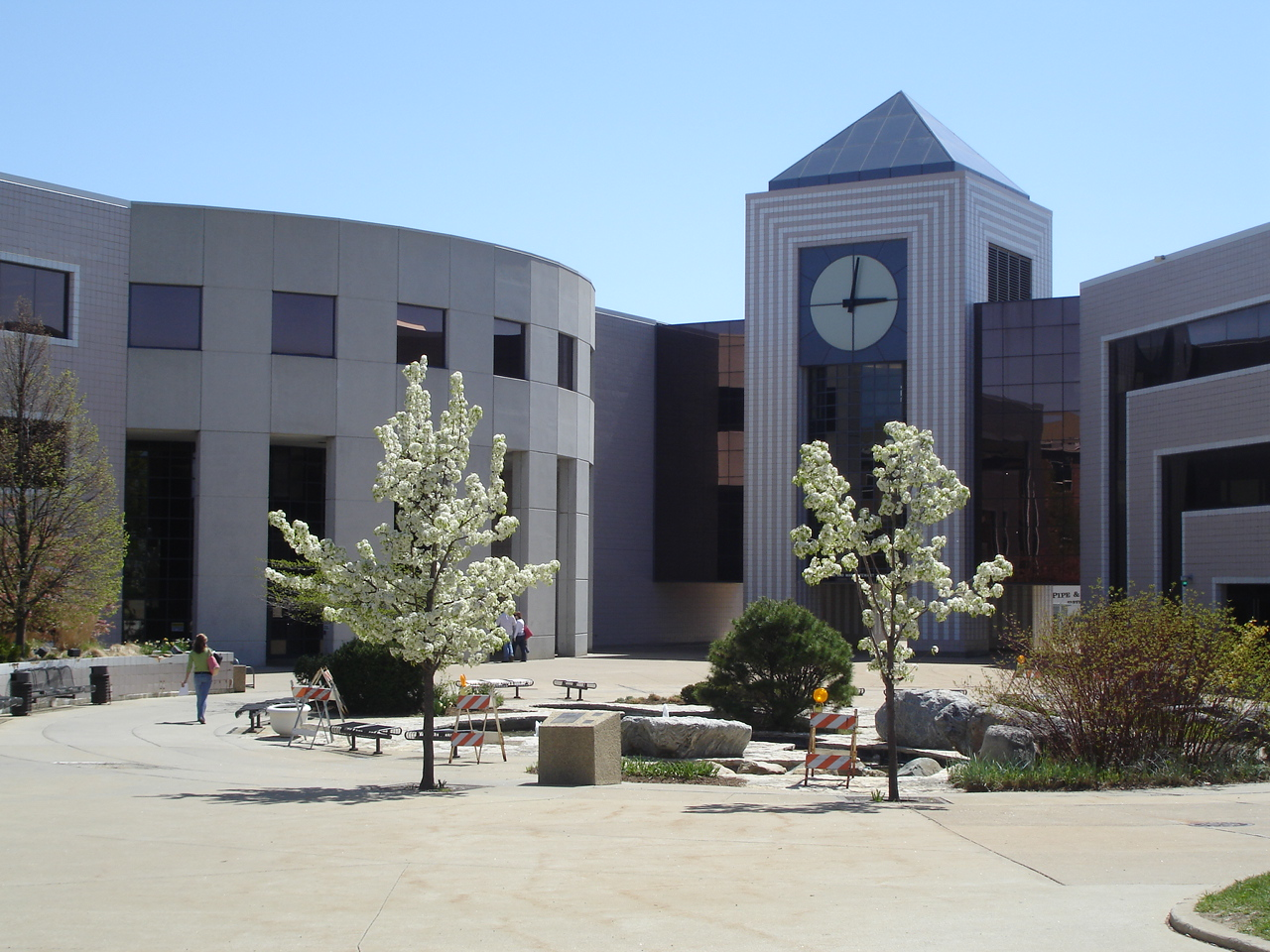
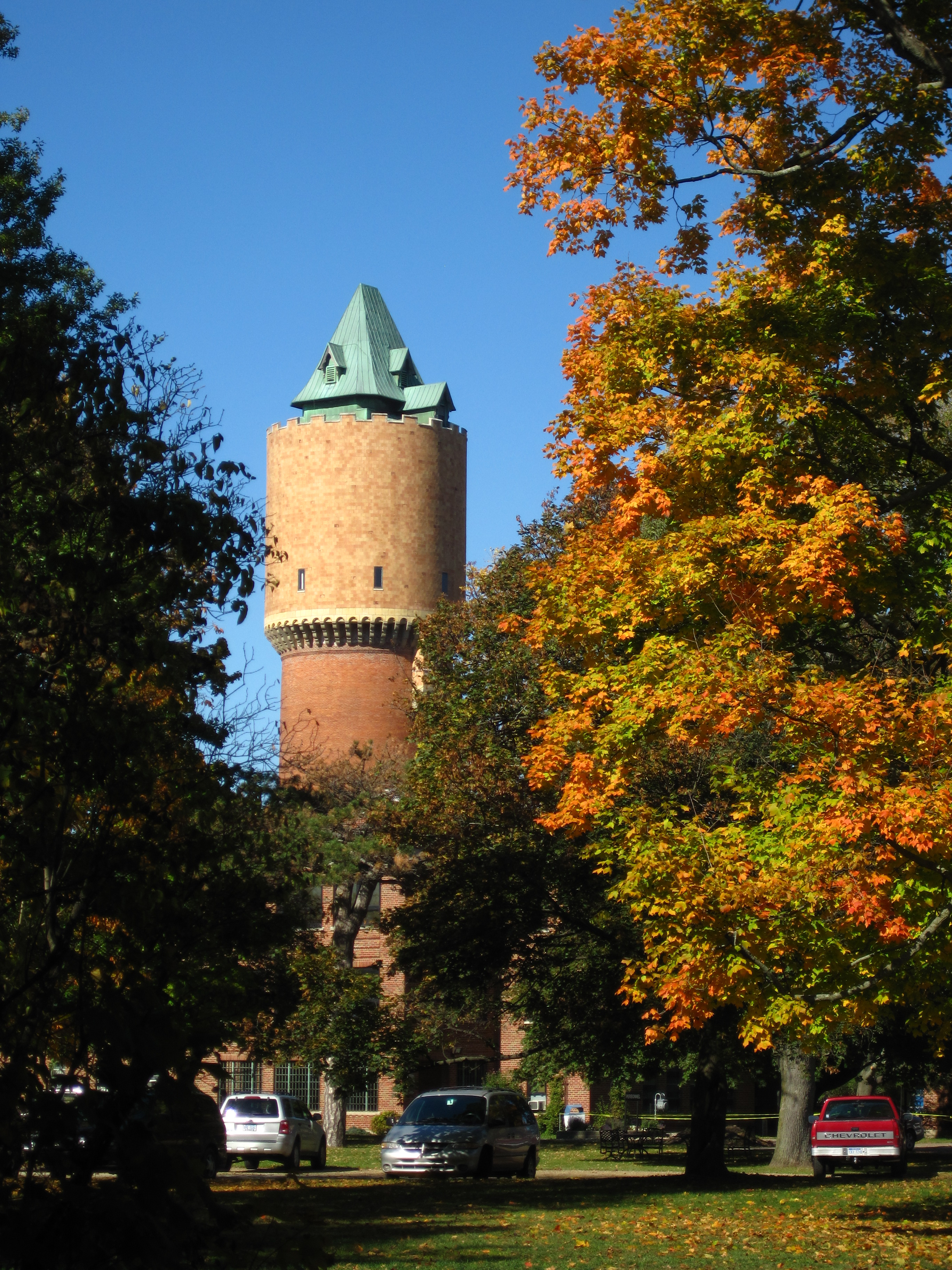
- Downtown skyline of Kalamazoo State Theatre Western Michigan University Waldo Stadium KPH Water Tower

- Flag Seal Logo
- Nicknames: The Mall City, Kzoo, The Zoo
- Interactive map of Kalamazoo, Michigan
- Location within Michigan Location within the United States
- Coordinates: 42°17′24″N 85°35′09″W
- Country: United States
- State: Michigan
- County: Kalamazoo
- Settled: 1829
- Incorporated: 1843 (village); 1884 (city)

Government
  - Type: City commission
  - Mayor: David Anderson (D)
  - Vice mayor: Drew Duncan
  - Manager: Malcolm Hankins

Area
  - City: 25.14 sq mi (65.12 km^{2})
  - Land: 24.70 sq mi (63.96 km^{2})
  - Water: 0.45 sq mi (1.16 km^{2})
- Elevation: 784 ft (239 m)

Population (2020)
  - City: 73,598
  - Density: 2,980.69/sq mi (1,150.85/km^{2})
  - Urban: 204,562 (US: 189th)
  - Metro: 261,108 (US: 189th)
  - CSA: 500,670 (US: 89th)
- Time zone: UTC-5 (Eastern (EST))
  - Summer (DST): UTC-4 (EDT)
- ZIP Code(s): 49001, 49003–49009, 49019, 49048
- Area code: 269
- FIPS code: 26-42160
- GNIS feature ID: 0629439
- Website: Official website

Kalamazoo (/ˌkæləməˈzuː/ KAL-ə-mə-ZOO) is a city in Kalamazoo County, Michigan, United States, and its county seat. At the 2020 census, Kalamazoo had a population of 73,598. It is the principal city of the Kalamazoo–Portage metropolitan area in southwestern Michigan, which had a population of 261,670 in 2020.

One of Kalamazoo's most notable features is the Kalamazoo Mall, an outdoor pedestrian shopping mall. The city created the mall in 1959 by closing part of Burdick Street to automobile traffic, although two of the mall's four blocks have been reopened to auto traffic since 1999. Kalamazoo is home to Western Michigan University, a large public university, Kalamazoo College, a private liberal arts college, and Kalamazoo Valley Community College, a two-year community college.

== History ==
=== Etymology ===
Kalamazoo was originally known as Bronson, after Titus Bronson, its founder, who settled there in 1829. In 1836, it was renamed Kalamazoo after the river running by it (a name that had already been adopted by the county in 1830). The river's name derives from an Algonquian language and has been variously explained as meaning "boiling water", "mirage or reflecting river", "it smokes", and "otters beneath the surface". Virgil J. Vogel dismisses these as "etymological absurdit[ies]", favouring a meaning either of "it goes or runs fast" or "deep, still water" (and noting that different parts of the river could fit both of these descriptions). Early forms of the name include Kikanamaso (1760) and Ke-kal-i-ma-zoo (1821).

The name Kalamazoo, which sounds unusual to English speakers, has become a metonym for exotic places, as in the phrase "from Timbuktu to Kalamazoo". T-shirts are sold in Kalamazoo with the phrase "Yes, there really is a Kalamazoo". Well known in the city, the marketing slogan was introduced by the Kalamazoo County Convention and Visitors Bureau.

=== Early history ===
The area on which the modern city of Kalamazoo stands was once home to Native Americans of the Hopewell tradition, who migrated into the area sometime before the first millennium. Evidence of their early residence remains in the form of a small mound in downtown's Bronson Park. The Hopewell civilization began to decline after the eighth century, and was replaced by other groups. The Potawatomi culture lived in the area when the first European explorers arrived.

René-Robert Cavelier, Sieur de La Salle, passed just southeast of the present city of Kalamazoo in late March 1680. The first Europeans to reside in the area were itinerant fur traders in the late 18th and early 19th centuries. Records exist of several traders wintering in the area, and by the 1820s, at least one trading post had been established.

During the War of 1812, the British established a smithy and a prison camp in the area.

The 1821 Treaty of Chicago ceded the territory south of the Grand River to the United States federal government, but the area around present-day Kalamazoo was reserved as the village of Potawatomi Chief Match-E-Be-Nash-She-Wish. Six years later, as a result of the 1827 Treaty of St. Joseph, the tract that became the city of Kalamazoo was also ceded.

In 1829, Titus Bronson, originally from Connecticut, became the first white settler to build a cabin within the present city limits of Kalamazoo. He platted the town in 1831 and named it the village of Bronson—not to be confused with the much smaller Bronson, Michigan, about fifty miles (80 km) to the south-southeast of Kalamazoo.

Bronson, frequently described as "eccentric" and argumentative, was later run out of town. The village was renamed Kalamazoo in 1836, due in part to Bronson's being fined for stealing a cherry tree. Today, a hospital and a downtown park, among other things, are named for Bronson. Kalamazoo was legally incorporated as a village in 1838 and as a city in 1883.

The fertile farmlands attracted prosperous Yankee farmers who settled the surrounding area, and sent their sons to Kalamazoo to become businessmen, professionals, and entrepreneurs who started numerous factories. Most of the original settlers of Kalamazoo were New Englanders or from upstate New York.

E. E. Labadie's Souvenir of Picturesque Kalamazoo (PDF, 1909)

On August 27, 1856, Abraham Lincoln gave a speech in Kalamazoo during a campaign rally for John C. Fremont, the first Republican presidential candidate. The text of the speech was found by Lincoln historian Thomas I. Starr in a copy of the Detroit Daily Advertiser and published in a booklet. This was the only trip Lincoln ever made to Michigan. In July 2022, a local nonprofit, the Kalamazoo Abraham Lincoln Institute, was given permission by the city to place a statue of Lincoln in Bronson Park to commemorate the event.

In the 1940s, the city became the first to install curb cuts.

In 1959, the city created the Kalamazoo Mall, the first outdoor pedestrian shopping mall in the United States, by closing part of Burdick Street to auto traffic. The mall was designed by Victor Gruen, who also designed the country's first enclosed shopping mall, which had opened three years earlier. Two of the mall's four blocks were reopened to auto traffic in 1999 after much debate.

An F3 tornado struck downtown Kalamazoo on May 13, 1980, killing five and injuring 79.

On February 20, 2016, Kalamazoo became the site of a random series of shootings in which six people were killed. A prime suspect was apprehended by police without incident.

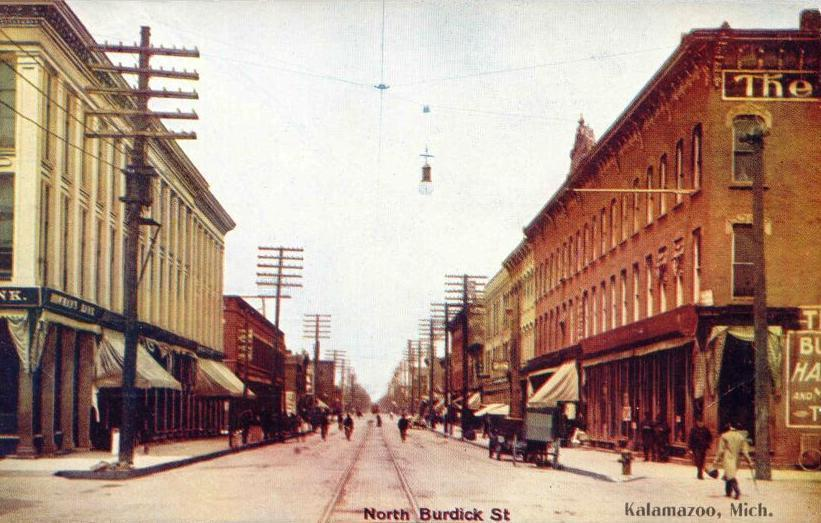
North Burdick St. in 1908

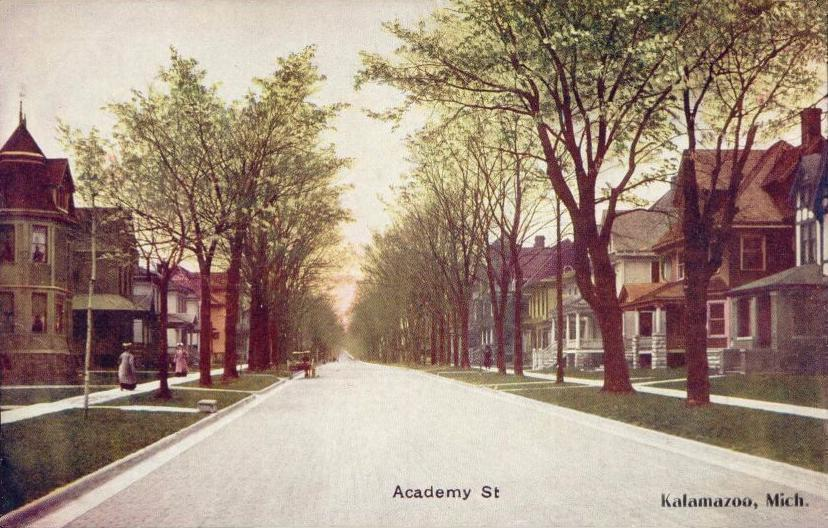
Academy St. in 1908

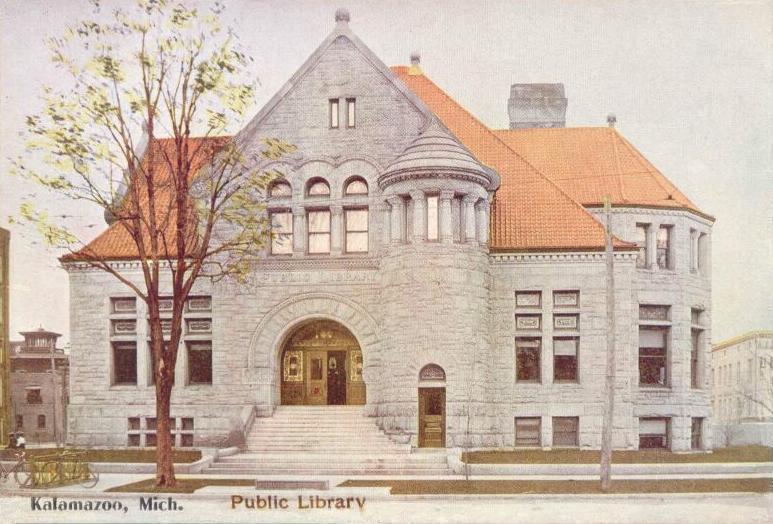
Old public library in 1908

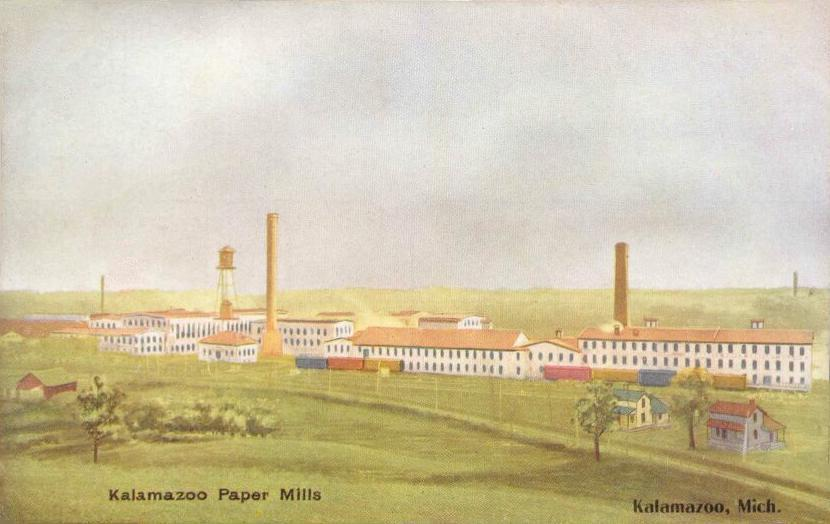
Paper mills in 1908

=== Economic history ===
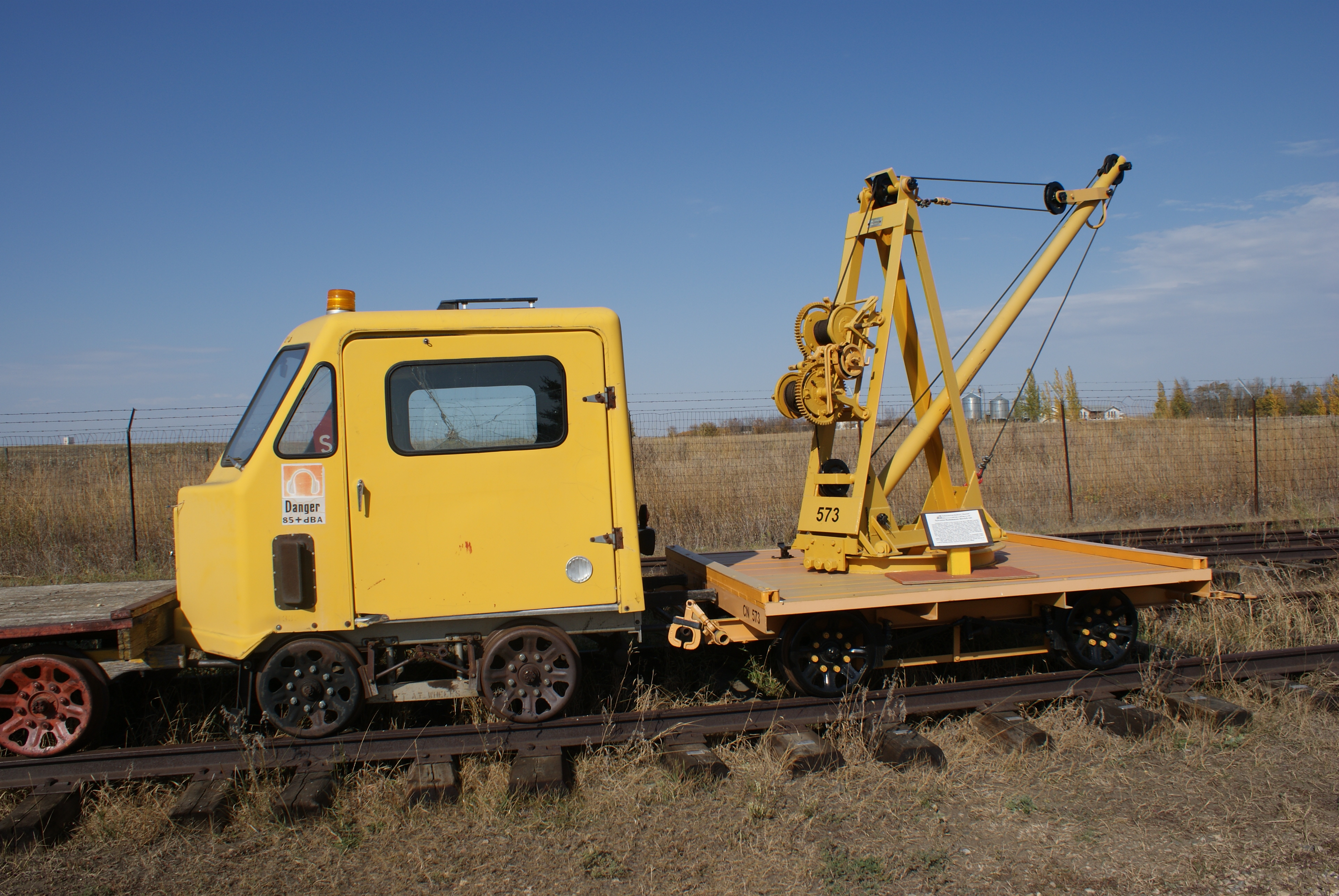
CNR derrick car (Sylvester Manufacturing Company, Kalamazoo Railway Supply Company). Mounted on a push car, pulled with a speeder or draisine.

In the past, Kalamazoo was known for its production of windmills, mandolins, buggies, automobiles, cigars, stoves, and paper and paper products. Agriculturally, it once was noted for celery. Although much of it has become suburbanized, the surrounding area still produces farm crops, primarily corn and soybeans. Many landmarks and hiking trails are still based around the past celery industry.

Kalamazoo was the original home of Gibson Guitar Corporation, which spawned the still-local Heritage Guitars. The company was incorporated as "Gibson Mandolin - Guitar Co., Ltd" on October 11, 1902, by craftsman Orville Gibson. One budget model was named the Gibson Kalamazoo "Melody Maker" Electric Guitar. Operations were moved gradually from Kalamazoo to Memphis, Tennessee (Electric Division) and Bozeman, Montana (Acoustic Division) in the 1980s. Some workers from the original factory stayed in Kalamazoo to create the Heritage Guitars company.

Kalamazoo was once known as the "Paper City" because of the paper mills in and near the city. The Allied Paper Corporation operated several mills and employed 1,300 people in Kalamazoo during the late 1960s. As the forests of West Michigan were logged, paper mills closed.

Early in the 20th century, Kalamazoo was home to the Brass Era car company Barley.

Kalamazoo was also headquarters of the Checker Motors Company, the former manufacturer of the Checker Cab, which also stamped sheet-metal parts for other auto manufacturers. Checker closed on June 25, 2009, a victim of the Great Recession.

== Geography ==
Most of Kalamazoo is on the southwest bank of a major bend in the Kalamazoo River, with a small portion, about 2.8 square miles (7.3 km^{2}), on the opposite bank. Several small tributaries of the Kalamazoo River, including Arcadia Creek and Portage Creek, wind through the city. The northeastern portion of Kalamazoo sits in the broad, flat Kalamazoo Valley, while the western portions of Kalamazoo climb into low hills to the west and south. Several small lakes are found throughout the area. It is halfway between Detroit and Chicago along I-94. In addition, it is 50 mi (80 km) south of Grand Rapids and 75 mi (121 km) southwest of Lansing.

According to the United States Census Bureau, Kalamazoo has a total area of 25.11 square miles (65.03 km^{2}), of which 0.43 sq mi (1.11 km^{2}) is covered by water.

Kalamazoo's suburban population is located primarily to the south, in the city of Portage, and to the west in Oshtemo and Texas townships.

At least part of the municipal water supply for Kalamazoo is provided by the watershed contained within the Al Sabo Preserve in Texas Charter Township, Michigan, immediately southwest of Kalamazoo.

Another watershed, Kleinstuck Marsh, is popular with hikers and birdwatchers. Kleinstuck Marsh is south of Maple Street, between Oakland Drive and Westnedge Avenue, Kalamazoo's major north–south artery.

=== Neighborhoods ===
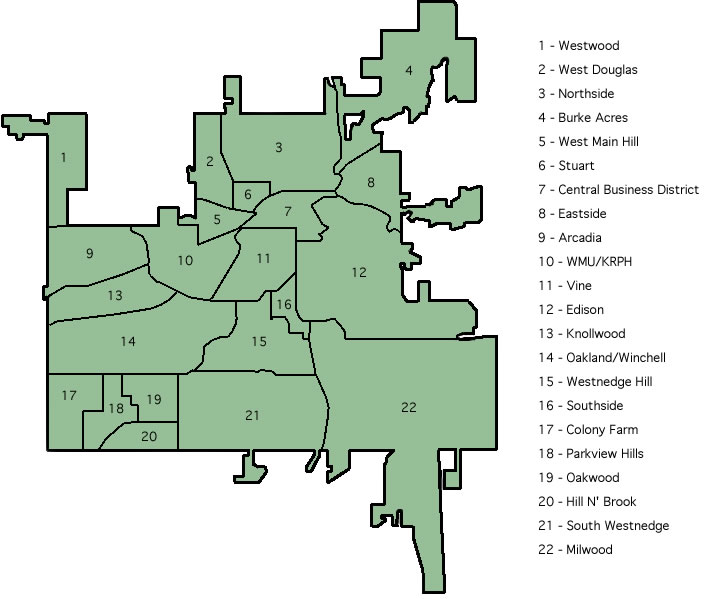
Kalamazoo neighborhoods numbered

The city of Kalamazoo is commonly divided into 22 neighborhoods, many of which are served by a neighborhood association. The Neighborhood Development Division of the city's government works with these associations to invest federal, state, and local funds, including those from the Community Development Block Grant program, in community improvements and economic growth.

=== Climate ===
Climate chart for Kalamazoo

Kalamazoo has a humid continental (Köppen Dfa) climate. Summers can be hot and humid with warm weather lasting a considerable part of the year. Tornadoes are rare but possible in Kalamazoo. One notable, major tornado occurred in 1980 which ripped through downtown Kalamazoo, causing extensive damage. In winter, temperatures occasionally plummet below 0°F (-18°C). Kalamazoo has been known for brutal snowstorms even in early April, although some winter days have no snow on the ground at all. Lake-effect snowstorms are commonplace in the winter.

Climate data for Kalamazoo Battle Ck Intl Ap, MI, 1991–2020 normals, extremes 1887-present
Month	Jan	Feb	Mar	Apr	May	Jun	Jul	Aug	Sep	Oct	Nov	Dec	Year
Record high °F (°C)	67 (19)	71 (22)	85 (29)	89 (32)	96 (36)	102 (39)	109 (43)	104 (40)	100 (38)	90 (32)	81 (27)	69 (21)	109 (43)
Mean maximum °F (°C)	51.9 (11.1)	54.6 (12.6)	69.9 (21.1)	80.0 (26.7)	86.5 (30.3)	92.1 (33.4)	93.0 (33.9)	91.8 (33.2)	89.6 (32.0)	80.4 (26.9)	66.0 (18.9)	55.5 (13.1)	94.9 (34.9)
Mean daily maximum °F (°C)	31.5 (−0.3)	34.7 (1.5)	45.9 (7.7)	59.3 (15.2)	70.3 (21.3)	79.5 (26.4)	83.1 (28.4)	81.1 (27.3)	74.1 (23.4)	61.3 (16.3)	47.6 (8.7)	36.5 (2.5)	58.7 (14.8)
Daily mean °F (°C)	24.8 (−4.0)	27.1 (−2.7)	36.6 (2.6)	48.5 (9.2)	59.5 (15.3)	68.8 (20.4)	72.6 (22.6)	70.8 (21.6)	63.3 (17.4)	51.6 (10.9)	40.1 (4.5)	30.4 (−0.9)	49.5 (9.7)
Mean daily minimum °F (°C)	18.1 (−7.7)	19.5 (−6.9)	27.3 (−2.6)	37.7 (3.2)	48.7 (9.3)	58.1 (14.5)	62.0 (16.7)	60.4 (15.8)	52.5 (11.4)	41.9 (5.5)	32.5 (0.3)	24.2 (−4.3)	40.2 (4.6)
Mean minimum °F (°C)	−2.5 (−19.2)	1.5 (−16.9)	8.4 (−13.1)	23.7 (−4.6)	33.6 (0.9)	43.8 (6.6)	50.7 (10.4)	48.8 (9.3)	39.1 (3.9)	29.0 (−1.7)	19.0 (−7.2)	6.8 (−14.0)	−6.4 (−21.3)
Record low °F (°C)	−20 (−29)	−22 (−30)	−12 (−24)	6 (−14)	24 (−4)	34 (1)	39 (4)	36 (2)	29 (−2)	17 (−8)	−7 (−22)	−14 (−26)	−22 (−30)
Average precipitation inches (mm)	1.70 (43)	1.34 (34)	2.01 (51)	3.07 (78)	3.70 (94)	3.20 (81)	3.36 (85)	3.66 (93)	3.27 (83)	3.74 (95)	2.50 (64)	1.68 (43)	33.23 (844)
Average precipitation days (≥ 0.01 in)	11.5	9.2	10.7	12.6	13.3	11.7	10.4	12.0	12.0	13.2	11.0	12.5	140.1
Source: NOAA

== Demographics ==
Historical population
Census	Pop.	Note	%±
1840	1,290		—
1850	2,507		94.3%
1860	6,070		142.1%
1870	9,181		51.3%
1880	11,937		30.0%
1890	17,853		49.6%
1900	24,404		36.7%
1910	39,437		61.6%
1920	48,487		22.9%
1930	54,786		13.0%
1940	54,097		−1.3%
1950	57,704		6.7%
1960	82,189		42.4%
1970	85,555		4.1%
1980	79,722		−6.8%
1990	80,277		0.7%
2000	76,145		−5.1%
2010	74,262		−2.5%
2020	73,598		−0.9%
U.S. Decennial Census; 2018 Estimate

=== 2020 census ===
As of the 2020 census, Kalamazoo had a population of 73,598. The median age was 28.9 years. 20.4% of residents were under the age of 18 and 11.9% of residents were 65 years of age or older. For every 100 females there were 97.1 males, and for every 100 females age 18 and over there were 95.1 males age 18 and over.

100.0% of residents lived in urban areas, while 0.0% lived in rural areas.

There were 29,844 households in Kalamazoo, of which 24.6% had children under the age of 18 living in them. Of all households, 26.2% were married-couple households, 27.2% were households with a male householder and no spouse or partner present, and 37.0% were households with a female householder and no spouse or partner present. About 38.7% of all households were made up of individuals and 11.1% had someone living alone who was 65 years of age or older.

There were 32,443 housing units, of which 8.0% were vacant. The homeowner vacancy rate was 1.9% and the rental vacancy rate was 7.0%.

Racial composition as of the 2020 census
Race	Number	Percent
White	44,382	60.3%
Black or African American	17,102	23.2%
American Indian and Alaska Native	485	0.7%
Asian	1,617	2.2%
Native Hawaiian and Other Pacific Islander	29	0.0%
Some other race	3,395	4.6%
Two or more races	6,588	9.0%
Hispanic or Latino (of any race)	6,664	9.1%

=== 2010 census ===
As of the census of 2010, there were 74,262 people, 29,141 households, and 13,453 families residing in the city. The population density was 3,009.0 inhabitants per square mile (1,161.8/km^{2}). There were 32,433 housing units at an average density of 1,314.1 per square mile (507.4/km^{2}). The racial makeup of the city was 68.1% White, 22.2% African American, 0.5% Native American, 1.7% Asian, 2.8% from other races, and 4.6% from two or more races. Hispanic or Latino residents of any race were 6.4% of the population.

There were 29,141 households, of which 25.8% had children under the age of 18 living with them, 26.1% were married couples living together, 15.6% had a female householder with no husband present, 4.5% had a male householder with no wife present, and 53.8% were non-families. 36.8% of all households were made up of individuals, and 9.3% had someone living alone who was 65 years of age or older. The average household size was 2.29 and the average family size was 3.04.

The median age in the city was 26.2 years. 20.5% of residents were under the age of 18; 27% were between the ages of 18 and 24; 24.9% were from 25 to 44; 18.2% were from 45 to 64; and 9.4% were 65 years of age or older. The gender makeup of the city was 49.3% male and 50.7% female.

=== 2000 census ===
As of 2000, the median income for a household in the city was $31,189, and the median income for a family was $42,438. Males had a median income of $32,160 versus $25,532 for females. The per capita income for the city was $16,897. About 13.6% of families and 24.3% of the population were below the poverty line, including 26.0% of those under age 18 and 11.3% of those age 65 or over.

=== Crime ===
Kalamazoo has a higher crime rate than the national average. Crime is spread throughout Kalamazoo and is especially high in the inner neighborhoods such as Edison, the Northside and Vine. Crime is lower in the downtown area and most of the southwest area. The aggravated assault rate in 2015 was 793.3 per 100,000—3.3 times the national average. The murder rate was 12.5 per 100,000 in 2010 and 7.9 in 2014. The 2016 Kalamazoo shootings by Uber driver Jason Dalton claimed 6 lives and caused 2 serious injuries in Kalamazoo County. Between 2008 and 2013 firearms were involved in 61% of homicides in Kalamazoo county compared to 77% statewide.

== Economy ==
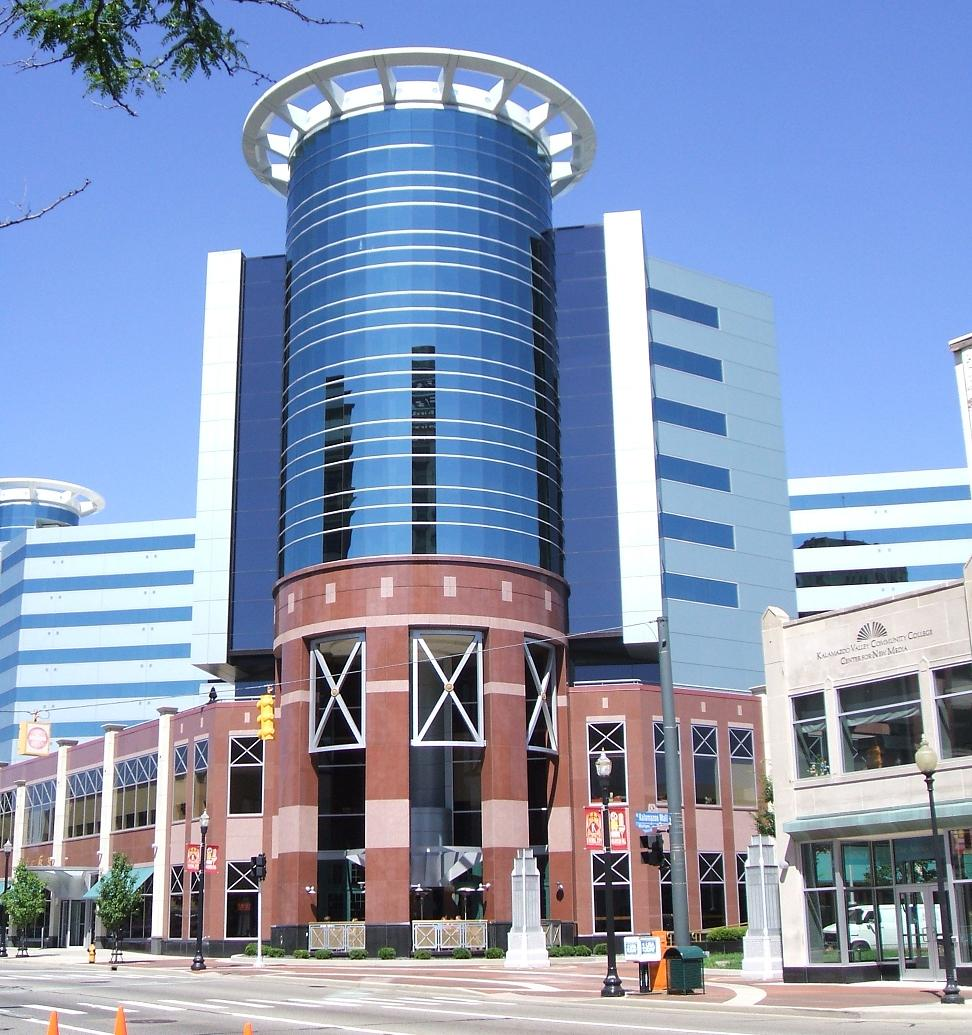
The Radisson Plaza Hotel at Kalamazoo Center

=== Breweries and distilleries ===
Kalamazoo has many local breweries and brewpubs that produce a variety of beer styles. Perhaps the best-known is Bell's Brewery, established as the Kalamazoo Brewing Company in 1985 by Larry Bell. The brewery has expanded from its original Kalamazoo location, which houses the Eccentric Cafe, to another brewery in nearby Comstock Charter Township. Bell's beer is distributed to 40 US states, Washington DC and Puerto Rico. Other local breweries include Tibb's Brewing Company, Rupert's Brewhouse (2013-2019), Boatyard Brewing Co. (2014-2019), One Well Brewing, and Latitude 42 Brewing Company, the latter in the southern suburb of Portage. On a smaller scale, Olde Peninsula Brewpub, Bravo! restaurant, and Bilbo's Pizza and Brewing Company serve their own brews.

The area is also a hotbed for home brewing and partners with neighboring Grand Rapids to form what is widely considered one of America's more important regions in American craft beer explosion. In recent years, at least two community events have evolved from the growing craft beer industry in the Kalamazoo area (Kalamazoo Beer Week (annual), Kalamazoo Craft Beer Festival). In 2015, the Give a Craft beer trail and passport were introduced. A shuttle bus (Kalamazoo Brew Bus) service and party bike tour service became available in 2016.

In 2015, Rupert's Brew House entered the Kalamazoo craft spirits market. Two additional distilleries, Green Door Distilling, formerly Revival Distilling and Kalamazoo Distilling Company, are in the licensing stage.

=== Flavorings ===
The A.M. Todd Company, one of the lead producers of peppermint oil and other flavorings, is headquartered in Kalamazoo. Its founder, Albert M. Todd, was elected to the United States House of Representatives for the 55th Congress.

Kalamazoo is also home to Kalsec, another flavorings company, which was founded by Paul H. Todd Jr., Albert Todd's grandson and U.S. Representative in the 89th Congress. Founded as the Kalamazoo Spice Extraction Company, Kalsec is owned and managed by Todd family descendants.

=== Manufacturing ===
Health technology company Stryker Corporation was founded in Kalamazoo in 1941, and was headquartered in the city until 2023, when it moved to neighboring Portage.

Kalamazoo Outdoor Gourmet designs and manufactures outdoor kitchen equipment.

Fabri-Kal, a supplier of food service and other containers produced from thermoform plastic or plant-based materials (Greenware product line), has operated corporate headquarters in Kalamazoo since the 1960s. The company closed the Kalamazoo-based manufacturing facilities in 1991, but returned and expanded manufacturing capacity in 2008 with the opening of a LEED-certified 400,000 square foot (37,000 m^{2}) facility. In recent years, the company's product lines have introduced sustainable and plant-based materials, and innovations to reduce the plastic content of consumer and other packaging.

Parker Hannifin Aerospace's Hydraulic Systems Division (HSD) is located at 2220 Palmer Ave in Kalamazoo, Michigan. The 170,000-square foot facility designs, manufactures, and services hydraulic components for both military and commercial aerospace sectors. It produces hydraulic axial piston pumps and motors, electric motor-driven pumps, hydraulic power transfer/supply units, electrohydraulic power modules, hydraulic thrust-reverser & landing gear actuators, accumulators, reservoirs, filter modules and valve packs.

In 2014, Newell Rubbermaid established a global product design center in Kalamazoo, consolidating fifteen global design units at a single location within the Western Michigan University Business Technology and Research Park. The Business Technology and Research Park is also home to design firm TEKNA Solutions. In 2015, Kalamazoo-based landscape design and manufacturing firm Landscape Forms, Inc., received five National Design Awards.

=== Life sciences ===
Beacon Kalamazoo Hospital

Kalamazoo hospitals include: Kalamazoo Regional Psychiatric Hospital, Bronson Methodist Hospital, and Beacon Kalamazoo. Beacon Kalamazoo was formerly known as Ascension Borgess Hospital until its acquisition in 2025. Western Michigan University Homer Stryker M.D. School of Medicine (WMed) is a collaboration involving Western Michigan University and Kalamazoo's two teaching hospitals, Beacon Kalamazo and Bronson Methodist.

The Upjohn Company was a pharmaceutical research and manufacturing firm founded in 1886 in Kalamazoo; through a series of mergers and acquisitions that took place between 1995 and 2003, the Upjohn Company assets became a part of the Pfizer Corporation. Most of Upjohn's original facilities remain, many have been renovated and some new buildings have been constructed. The bulk of the former Upjohn Company facilities in the area exist in Portage, under Pfizer or Zoetis operation; others, located in downtown Kalamazoo, have been re-purposed as the campus of the Western Michigan University Homer Stryker M.D. School of Medicine, the research and development headquarters of Zoetis, and office space for Bronson Methodist Hospital.

The global Research and Development organization of Zoetis, the world's largest producer of medicine and vaccinations for pets and livestock, is headquartered in downtown Kalamazoo.

=== Research and development ===
The W. E. Upjohn Institute for Employment Research, a nonpartisan, not-for-profit research organization, has operated in Kalamazoo since its establishment in 1945. The institute conducts research into the causes and effects of unemployment, and measures for the alleviation of unemployment. The institute also publishes Business Outlook for West Michigan, a quarterly journal that provides economic analysis and forecasts on the West Michigan economy.

The economic development organization Southwest Michigan First was established in Kalamazoo in 1999, with a focus on community capitalism. The organization was recognized as a Best and Brightest Company to Work For in 2013, and has received Fast Company commendations for innovative strategies to improve the economy. In 2015, two members of Southwest Michigan First were selected for Development Counsellors International's "2015 40 under 40," top 40 young economic developers in the United States.

== Arts and culture ==
Entrance Hall at Kalamazoo Valley Museum

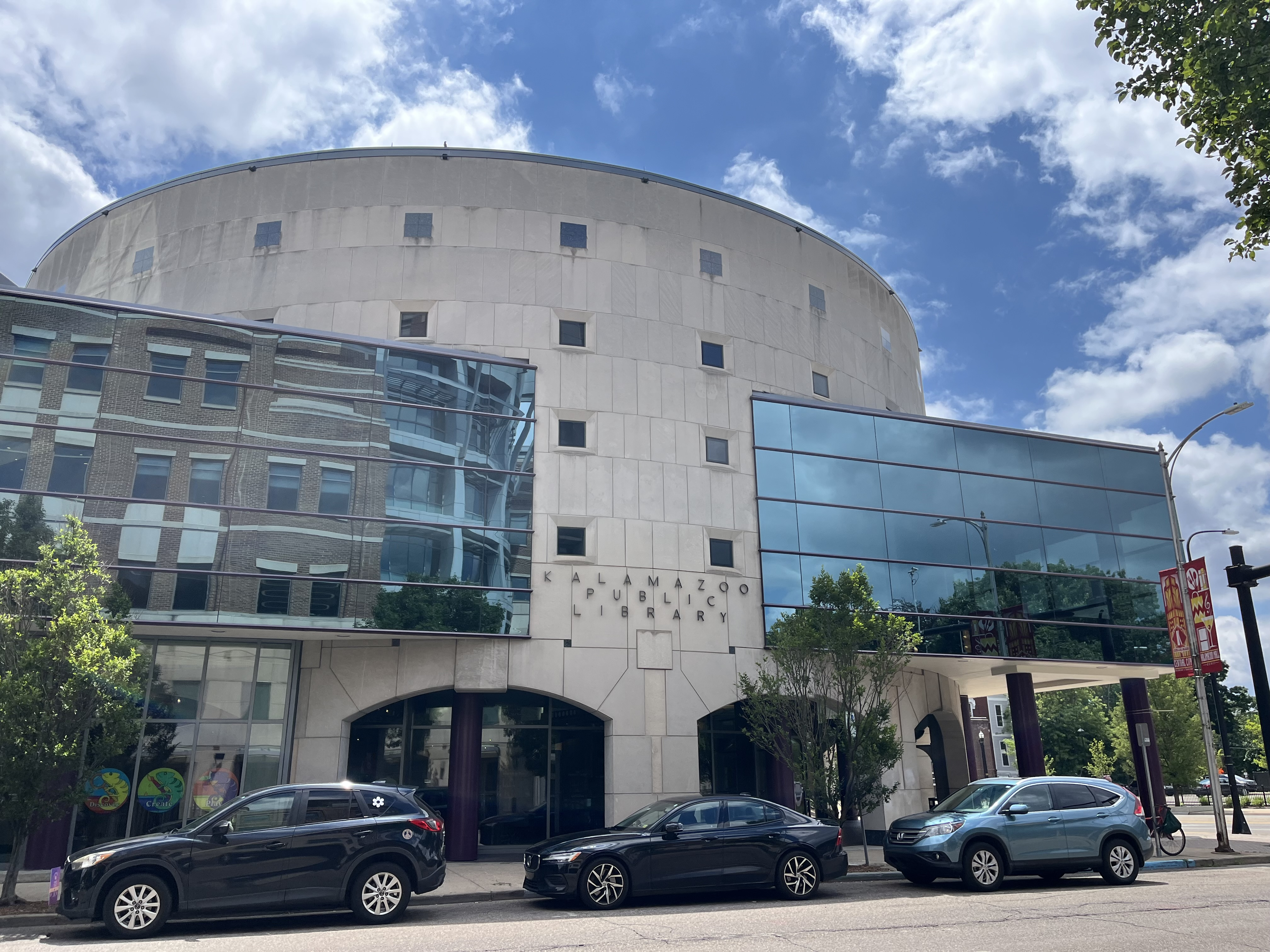
Kalamazoo Public Library

The city has an Arts Council. On the first Friday of each month, the council organizes the 'Art Hop'. Art Hop is a free event, during which downtown businesses and galleries display works by local artists, and patrons 'hop' from venue to venue, enjoying art, live music, and the chance to interact with local artists. A popular site during Art Hop is the Park Trades Center, which houses the Kalamazoo Book Arts Center, Glass Art Kalamazoo, and many other studios.

On New Year's Eve, downtown Kalamazoo is the site of an annual New Year's Fest celebration. This celebration is centered at Bronson Park and surrounding venues, allowing patrons to walk from venue to venue to enjoy an all ages showcase of performing arts and other activities (music, magic, comedy, exhibitions, fireworks, food). Initiated in 1985, the event has grown in scope and popularity.

Music groups and other performing artists perform at the downtown State Theatre, Western Michigan University's Miller Auditorium, and Wings Event Center. The annual "Eccentric Day" at Bell's Eccentric Cafe celebrates the brewery's Eccentric Ale on the December Friday that marks the end of finals at Western Michigan University. The Moped Army was founded in Kalamazoo in 1997.

Next to Milham Park is the Milham Park Golf Course. Completed in 1936, the 18-hole, par-72 course is entirely within the city limits of Kalamazoo. During winter, sledding and cross-country skiing are popular activities at the golf course (free of charge). In recent years, the Kalamazoo Nordic Skiers club has groomed and maintained skate ski and classic ski trails for community use.

In 2002, the Kalamazoo Public Library was named "Library of the Year" by Library Journal. The library includes a main location and four branch libraries, and until 2010, a bookmobile system. In 2014, the library opened 'The Hub', a digital lab open to the public for digitizing photos and video, producing podcasts, preserving old vinyl records, cassettes and VHS tapes, and other services.

Kalamazoo's theaters and performing groups include the Kalamazoo Civic Theatre, The New Vic Theatre, Farmers Alley Theatre, Crawlspace Theatre Productions, The State Theater, and the Barn Theatre in nearby Augusta. Plays and musicals are also performed at Kalamazoo College and Western Michigan University.

=== Animation festival ===
A project of Kalamazoo Valley Community College, The Kalamazoo Animation Festival International (KAFI) encourages and educates animation artists, promotes Kalamazoo's animation industry, and provides community entertainment. In addition to a biannual festival, KAFI sponsors events such as film screenings and workshops throughout the year.

KAFI's first festival drew 235 submissions and nearly 1,000 attendees in 2002. A second festival was held in 2003. Since then, an every-other-year schedule has been adopted. The 2007 festival attracted more than 500 entries from 37 countries. In addition to an animated film competition with $15,000 in prizes awarded, the festival features events for students, artists, educators, filmmakers and the general public. Past KAFI award winners include Bill Plympton, Chris Landreth and John Canemaker.

=== Museums ===
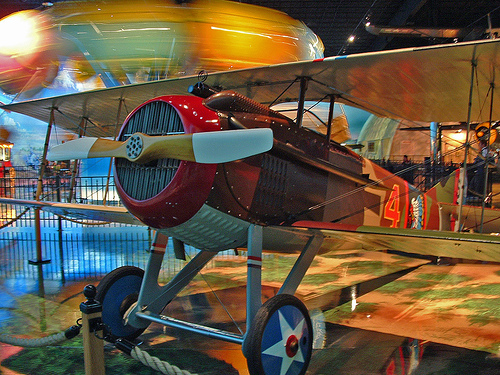
Spad WWI fighter in the Kalamazoo Air Zoo

The city's most prominent art museum is the Kalamazoo Institute of Arts, whose collection has more than 3,600 works and a focus on 20th-century American art. The KIA regularly mounts temporary exhibitions. The Kalamazoo Valley Museum, established in 1881, is an American Association of Museums accredited museum operated by Kalamazoo Valley Community College. The museum features "hands-on" exhibits aimed largely at children, and has a planetarium and a Challenger Learning Center.

Northeast of town, in Hickory Corners, is the Gilmore Car Museum, which includes cars used in Walt Disney movies. The Kalamazoo Air Zoo, just south of town in Portage, Michigan, has several dozen aircraft on display, from biplanes to jets.

=== Music ===
The Gibson Guitar Corporation, founded in Kalamazoo in 1902, spurred local musicians to play a wide variety of styles, from classical and folk to modern rock (the company relocated to Nashville in 1984). The Kalamazoo Symphony Orchestra, founded in 1921, is directed by Raymond Harvey. The city also hosts the Irving S. Gilmore International Keyboard Festival, a Bach Festival, the Michigan Festival of Sacred Music, and the Stulberg International String Competition.

The local and indie music scene has produced pop stars such as RCA recording artists The Verve Pipe and Metal Blade recording artists Thought Industry. Kalamazoo is also host to the Kalamashoegazer music festival, held for the last 13 years and a showcase for both local and national shoegaze and dream pop bands.

== Sports ==
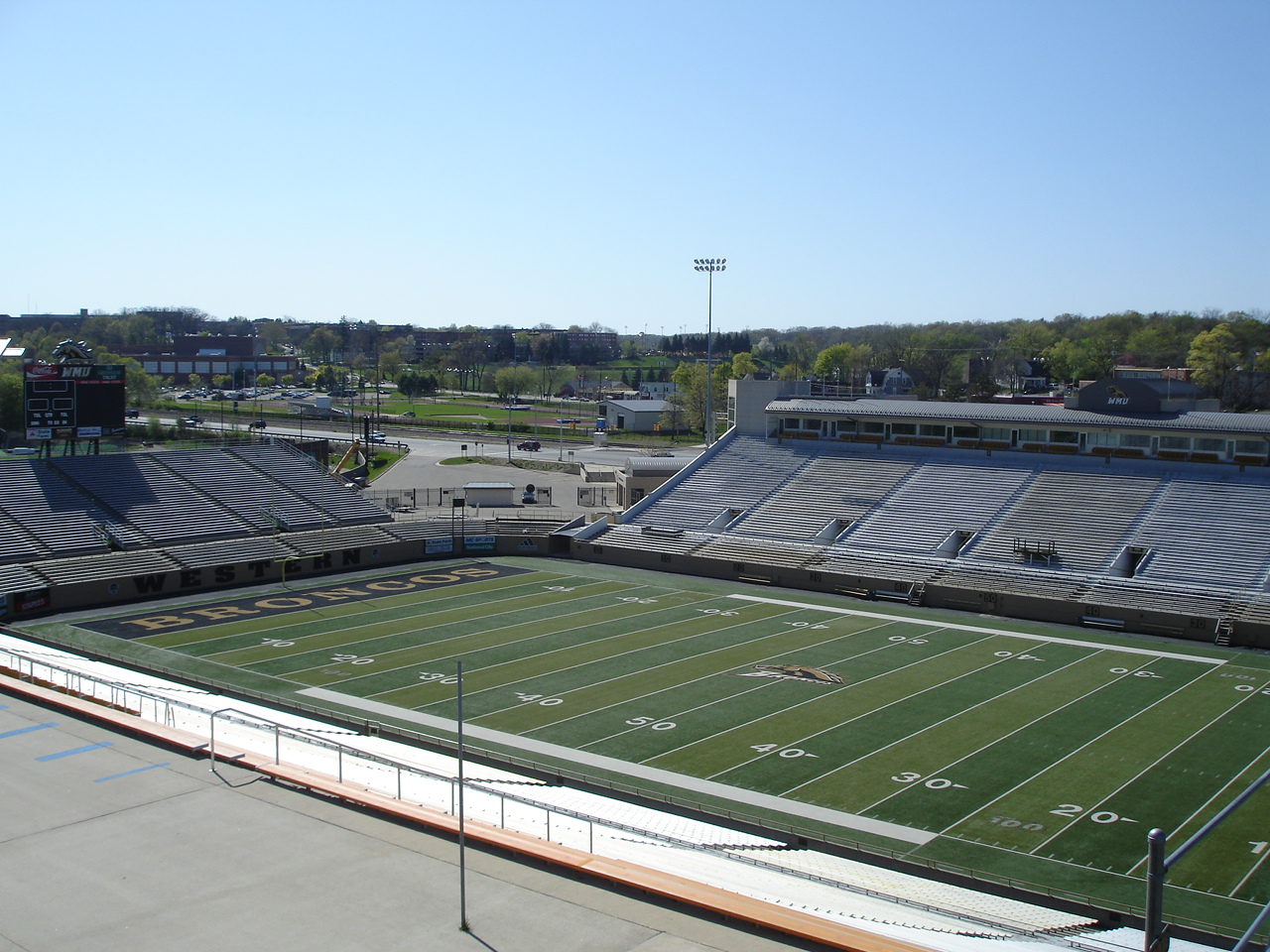
Waldo Stadium is on the campus of Western Michigan University.

Kalamazoo plays host to three non-collegiate teams:

- The Kalamazoo Growlers Summer Collegiate baseball team plays games in Homer Stryker Field. The team is currently a member of the Northwoods League.
- The Kalamazoo Wings (aka K-Wings) minor league hockey team play games in Wings Event Center and has played since 1974. The team is currently a member of the ECHL and is affiliated with both the Vancouver Canucks of the NHL and the Abbotsford Canucks of the AHL.
- The Kalamazoo FC, a National Premier Soccer League team, was established in 2016.

The Western Michigan University Broncos, who compete in the NCAA Division I Mid-American Conference, play at the following on-campus venues:

- Waldo Stadium (football)
- Lawson Arena (hockey)
- University Arena (basketball and Volleyball)
- Hyames Field (baseball)
- Ebert Field (softball)
- Kanley Track (outdoor track and field)

The Kalamazoo College Hornets and Kalamazoo Valley Community College Cougars also have several collegiate athletic teams.

Hyames Field played host to the first two College World Series held in 1947 and 1948. Future U.S. president George H. W. Bush was a first baseman for Yale in the 1947 series. In 1984–1986, the Kalamazoo Kangaroos, a Major Indoor Soccer League (MISL) team, played in Kalamazoo. In 2022–2023 The Kalamazoo Galaxy, a basketball team in The Basketball League (TBL) played at Wings Event Center.

Kalamazoo is the hometown of former New York Yankees shortstop Derek Jeter, former NFL wide receiver Greg Jennings, former NFL running back T. J. Duckett, the world's number one prize money winning pro bass fisherman Kevin VanDam, former MLB pitcher Scott Olsen, former NHL player Adam Hall and former Chicago White Sox first baseman Mike Squires. Kalamazoo was also the hometown of longtime Detroit Tigers owner John Fetzer, who owned the American League team from 1961 through 1984, when he sold the franchise to Domino's Pizza founder Tom Monaghan.

The United States Tennis Association Boys 18 and 16 National Tennis Championships are hosted every summer by Kalamazoo College. The event has featured such players as Jimmy Connors, John McEnroe, Jim Courier, Andre Agassi, Pete Sampras, Michael Chang, James Blake and Andy Roddick, before they turned professional. The Kalamazoo Rugby Football Club, founded in 1988, competes in the Michigan Rugby Football Union.

Since 2006, Wings Event Center has been the home of the Kalamazoo Derby Darlins roller derby league teams. Following up on successful events in 2010 and 2015, Wings Event Center and the Kalamazoo Curling Club will host the 2019 U.S. National Curling Championship.

The annual Kalamazoo Marathon, a USA Track & Field-certified and Boston Marathon-qualifying event, is part of a weekend of running and walking events.

== Parks and recreation ==
The Kal-Haven Trail, heavily used by cyclists, runners, walkers, and snowmobilers, extends to downtown Kalamazoo. It runs 34 miles (55 km) between South Haven, to a trailhead just west of Kalamazoo. Between that trailhead and South Haven the trail is run by Van Buren County, even the parts within Kalamazoo County. A trail pass is no longer required. The Kal-Haven is a rail trail, built on the former right-of-way of the Kalamazoo and South Haven Railroad. The section east of the trailhead was opened in 2008 and extends to downtown Kalamazoo. It is known as the Kalamazoo River Valley Trail and is run by Kalamazoo County. No pass is required on that section.

== Government ==
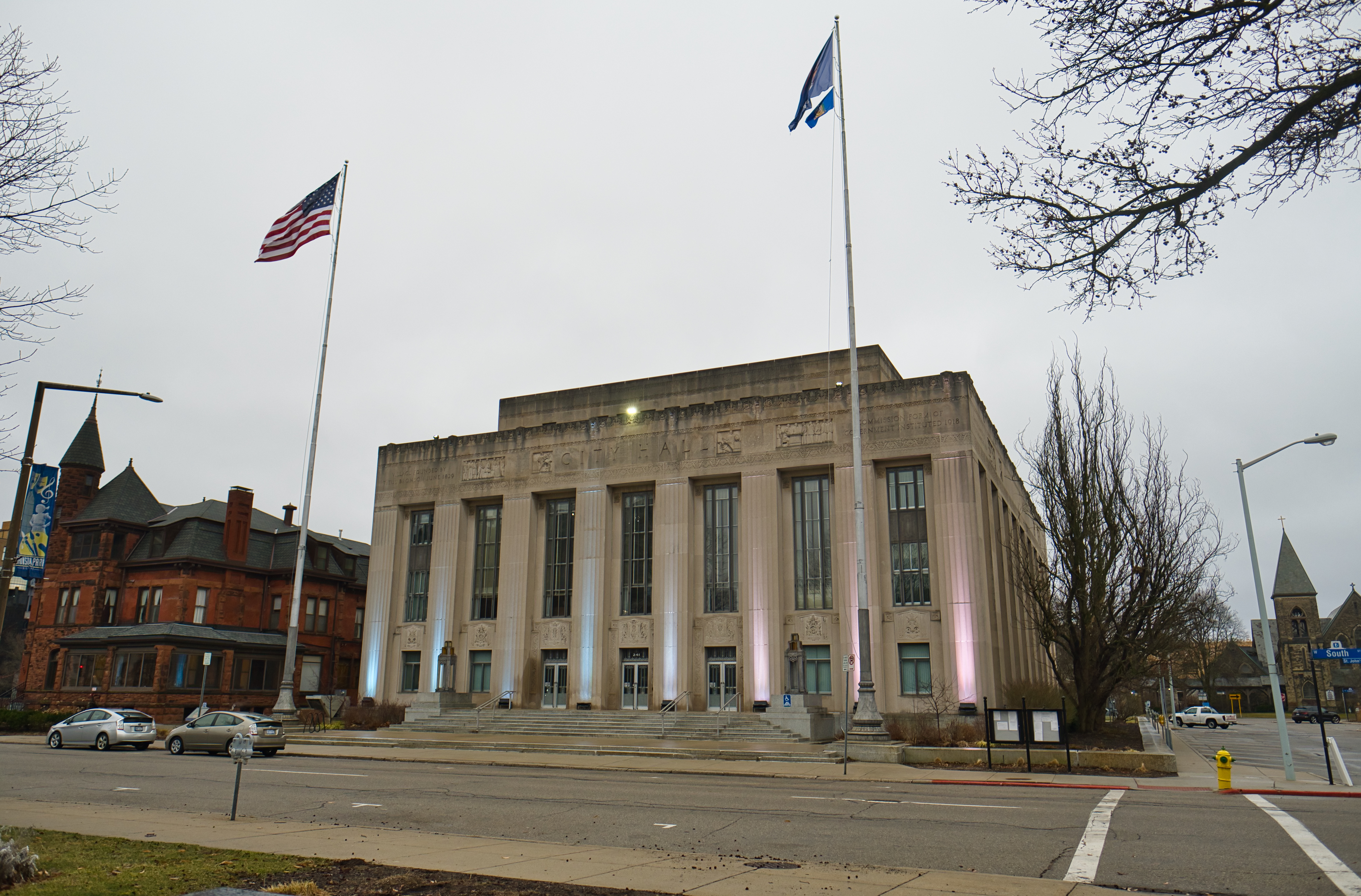
Kalamazoo City Hall

Kalamazoo government is administered under a commission-manager style of government. The city commission is the representative body of the city, and consists of seven members—six city commissioners and a separately elected mayor—elected on a staggered non-partisan basis every four years. Whoever receives the most votes during an election becomes vice mayor of the city for the first two years of their term until a new vice mayor is selected. As of 2022, the mayor, David F. Anderson, was elected to a second term on November 2, 2021, beating Ben Stanley with 78.7% of the vote. As of 2022, the vice mayor was Don Cooney, who won election in 2021 with 69.37% of the vote. The city manager is the city's chief administrative officer. The manager is hired by, and answers to, the city commission.

== Education ==
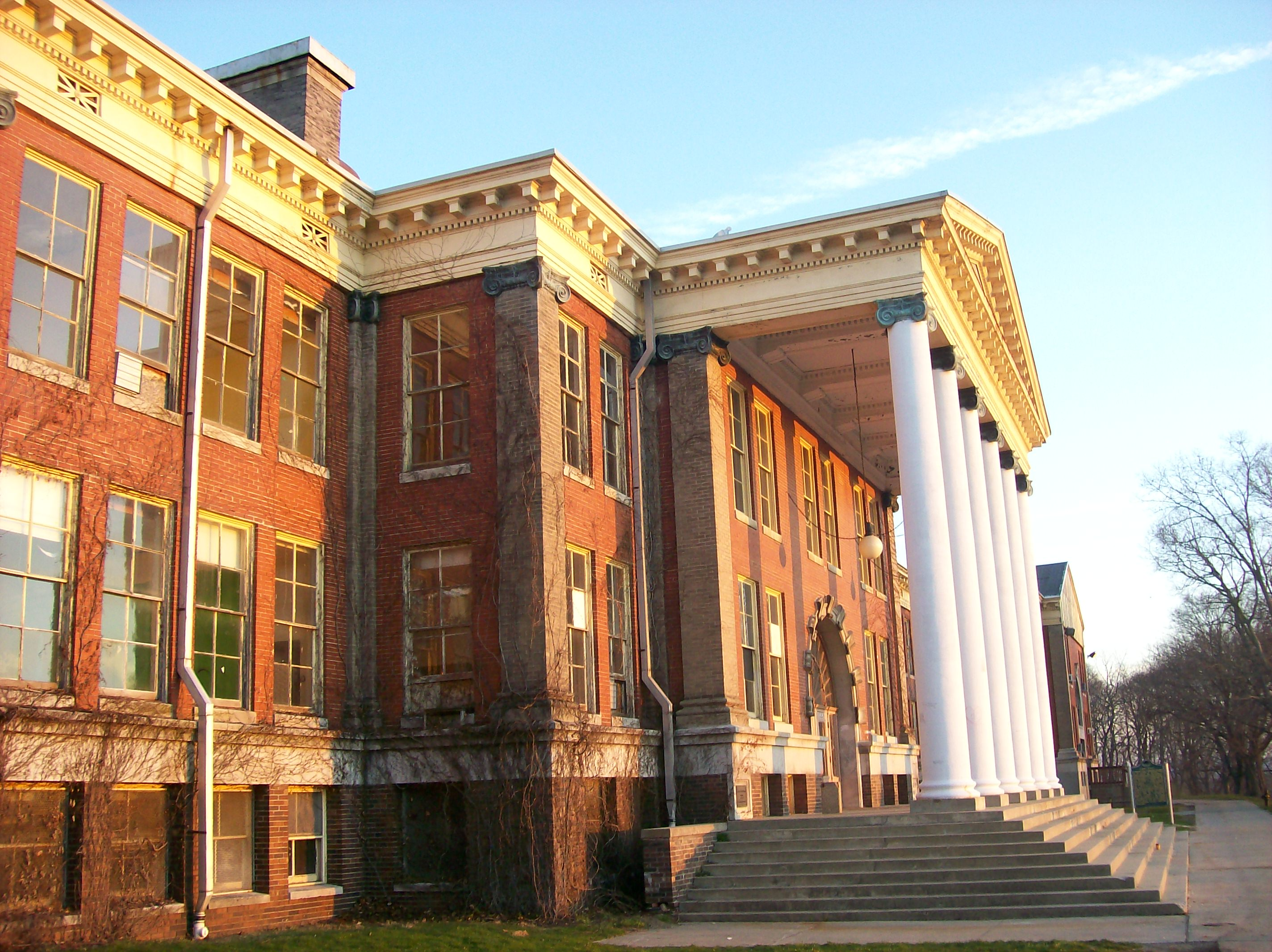
East Campus (Western Michigan University)

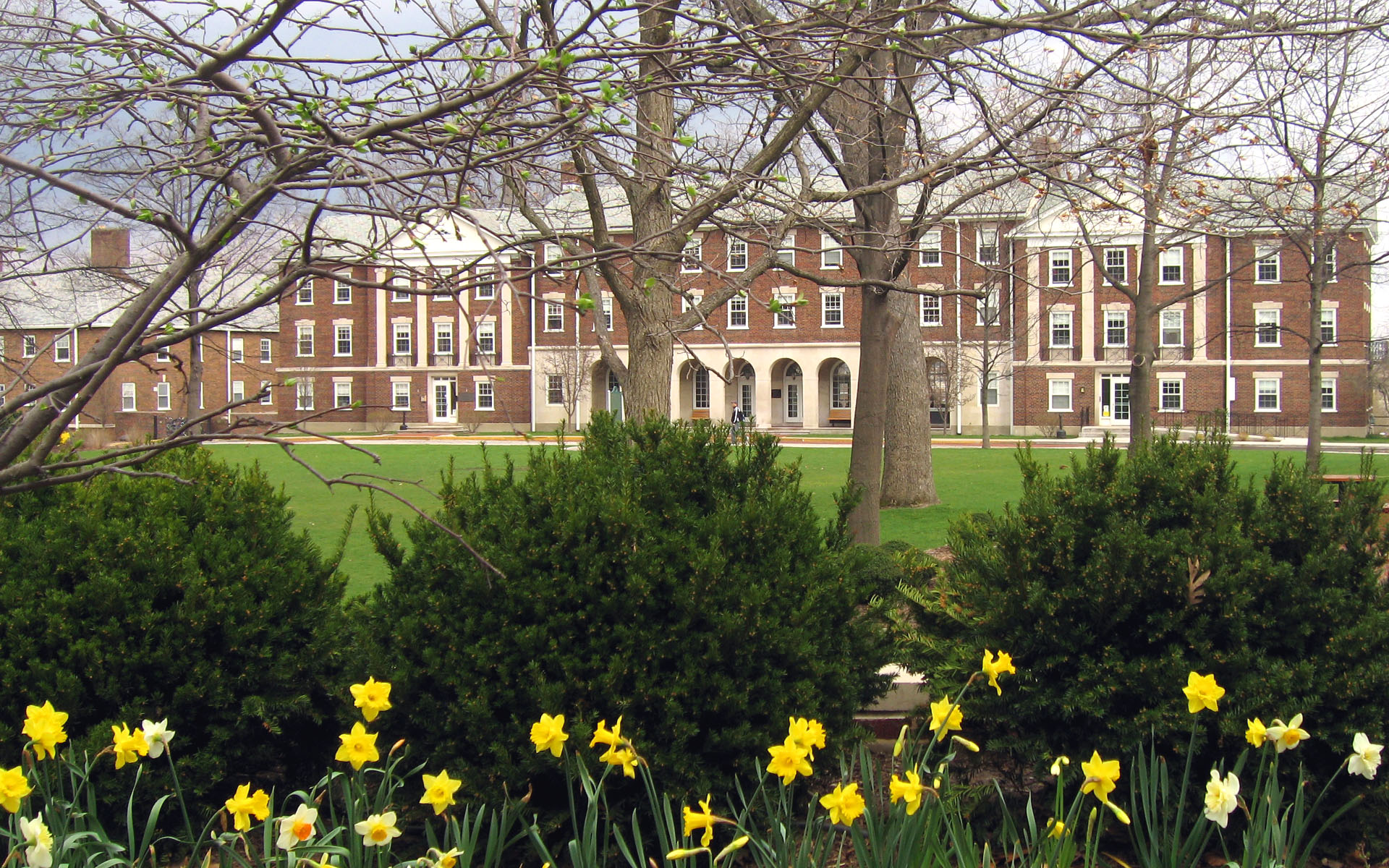
Kalamazoo College campus

Kalamazoo is home to Western Michigan University. The college has four campuses in Kalamazoo, namely the West Campus, East Campus, Parkview Campus and Oakland Drive Campus, as well as several regional locations throughout Michigan. West Campus, located just west of downtown, has the largest concentration of university students, programs and school services. Each May, WMU hosts the International Congress on Medieval Studies, which brings some 3,000 professors and students to discuss topics related to the Middle Ages.

Kalamazoo College, a private liberal arts college founded in 1833, is located on a hill opposite WMU's original campus. Kalamazoo is also home to Kalamazoo Valley Community College, Davenport University, and Kalamazoo Area Mathematics and Science Center (KAMSC). It had also been the home of Nazareth College, which closed in 1992.

The public schools for the vast majority of Kalamazoo are managed by Kalamazoo Public Schools. Every resident graduate of the Kalamazoo Public Schools is provided with a scholarship for up to 100% of tuition and mandatory fee costs for four years at any public university or community college in Michigan, starting with the class of 2006. This program is known as the Kalamazoo Promise. Small sections of Kalamazoo are in other school districts: Parchment School District, Comstock Public Schools and Portage Public Schools.

== Media ==
=== Newspapers ===
Kalamazoo is served by one daily newspaper, the Kalamazoo Gazette, which now prints seven and delivers two editions weekly. Business Review Western Michigan, a business-to-business publication headquartered in Kalamazoo, covering Western Michigan news, was rolled into MLive online coverage in late 2012.

=== Television ===
WWMT is licensed and operates out of Kalamazoo, originally own by John Fetzer. Along with television, Fetzer introduced Kalamazoo to radio in 1931, when AM 590 WKZO was founded, and created Kalamazoo's first cable television system, then known as Fetzer Cablevision.

Public Media Network in Kalamazoo hosts media outlets, including cable channels 187-191 where daily public access programs are produced and aired to the public.

Kalamazoo is part of the West Michigan television market.

=== Radio ===
FM radio stations that originate from Kalamazoo include:

- WCXK 88.3 - Kalamazoo - Christian Adult Contemporary
- WIDR 89.1 - Kalamazoo - College/Variety
- WKDS 89.9 - Kalamazoo - High School/Variety
- WWDK 94.1 - Jackson/Lansing/Battle Creek/Kalamazoo - Classic Country
- W238AL 95.5 - Kalamazoo - Urban Adult Contemporary (FM translator for AM 1560)
- WTOU 96.5 - Portage/Kalamazoo - Modern Adult Contemporary
- WNWN 98.5 - Coldwater/Battle Creek/Kalamazoo - Country
- WQXC 100.9 - Otsego/Kalamazoo - Oldies
- WMUK 102.1 - Kalamazoo - NPR/Talk/Classical/Jazz
- WKFR-HD2 102.5 - Kalamazoo - Urban Contemporary //WBXX 104.9
- WKFR 103.3 - Battle Creek/Kalamazoo - CHR/Top 40
- WVFM 106.5 - Kalamazoo - Variety Hits
- WKZO 106.9 - Kalamazoo - News/Talk (FM translator for AM 590)
- WRKR 107.7 - Portage/Battle Creek/Kalamazoo - Classic Rock

AM radio stations that originate in Kalamazoo:

- WKZO 590 - Kalamazoo - News/Talk - (FM translator at 106.9)
- WKMI 1360 - Kalamazoo - Talk
- WZOX 1660 - Kalamazoo - Urban Adult Contemporary

== Transportation ==
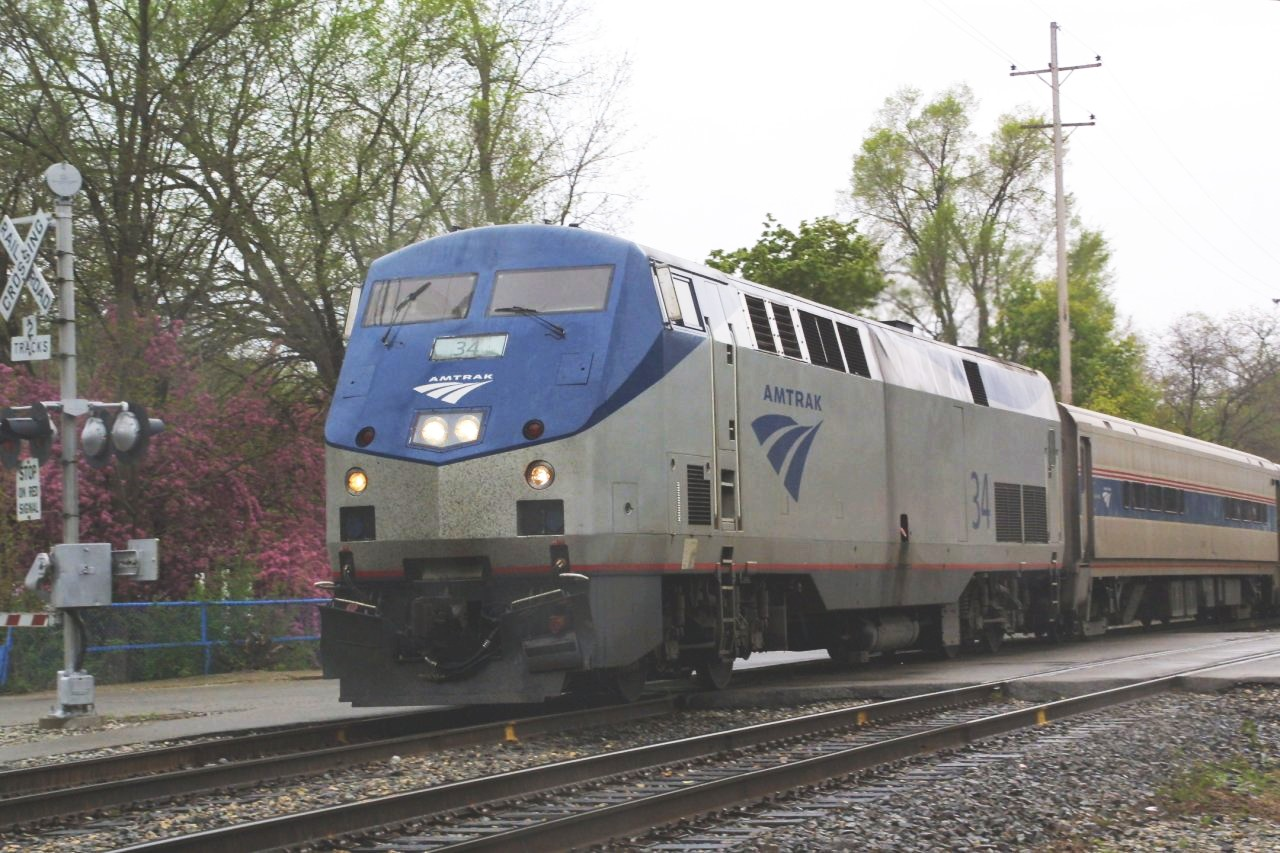
The Wolverine, eastbound, crosses Academy Street in Kalamazoo. The campus of Kalamazoo College lies to the right.

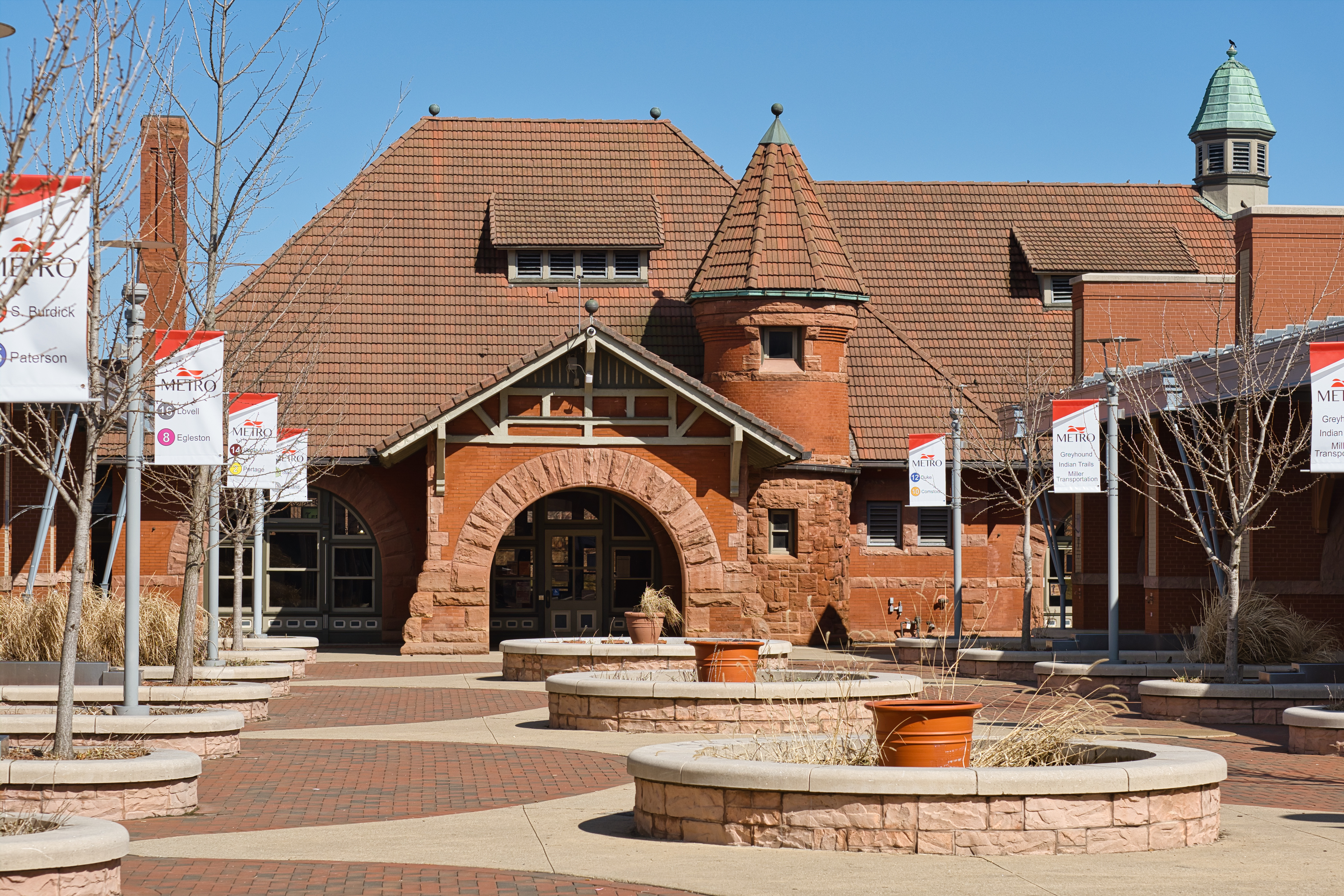
The Kalamazoo Transportation Center is the city's intermodal hub.

=== Highways ===
- I-94
- BS I-94
- US 131
- Bus. US 131 north of downtown Kalamazoo
- M-96
- M-343
- A-45

Kalamazoo is served by highways I-94, US 131, M-96 and M-343. It was on the original Territorial Road in Michigan of the 19th century, which started in Detroit and ran to Lake Michigan. Much of that, but not all, later became Old US 12—the "old" designation came about when I-94 was built parallel to it—and also was called Red Arrow Highway after a World War I army division. The name "US 12" was shifted south to what once was US 112 between Detroit and New Buffalo. Some parts of Old US 12 outside of town, especially in Van Buren and Berrien counties to the west, are still called Red Arrow Highway. The term "Old US 12" has faded from use.

=== Rail ===
Kalamazoo has rail service provided by Amtrak, with the station located downtown and combined with a newly renovated bus terminal. Kalamazoo serves as the hub and largest city in Amtrak's only high-speed corridor outside the Northeast, with 110-mile-per-hour (177 km/h) service between Porter, Indiana and Albion, Michigan. Kalamazoo also has a freight service provided by Grand Elk Railroad running north to Grand Rapids, Michigan and south to Elkhart, Indiana. The line they lease was a former Grand Rapids and Indiana Railroad mainline.

=== Bus ===
Bus service to and through the city is provided by Greyhound, Indian Trails and the Kalamazoo trolley. Public bus services within the city are provided by the Kalamazoo Metro.

=== Air ===
On the southern end of the city is the Kalamazoo/Battle Creek International Airport (AZO), which offers flights on various airlines to hubs and leisure destinations. Construction of a new $36 million terminal was completed in 2011.

== In popular culture ==
Notable songs about Kalamazoo include "(I've Got a Gal In) Kalamazoo" (1942).

Gibson guitar company made the Gibson Kalamazoo.

The "Kalamazoo" was one of several names of a railroad handcar produced by the Kalamazoo Manufacturing Company.

== Sister cities ==
The city of Kalamazoo, Michigan has three sister cities.

- Kingston, Jamaica
- Numazu, Shizuoka, Japan
- Pushkin, Saint Petersburg, Russia

== See also ==
- List of mayors of Kalamazoo, Michigan
- Kalamazoo Department of Public Safety
