= Kalamazoo Valley Museum =

Museum in Kalamazoo, Michigan, US

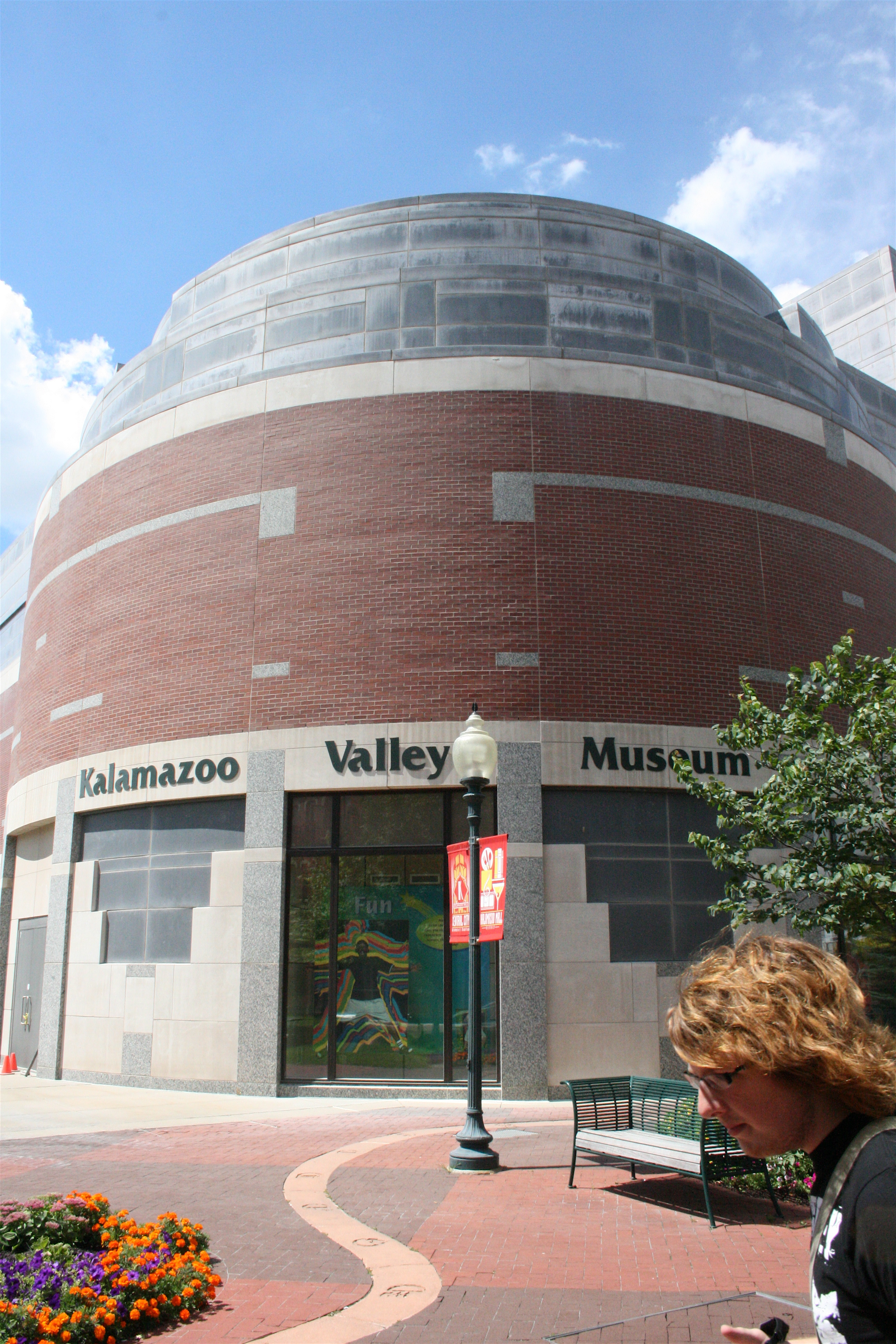
- The back of the Museum. A pedestrian stands in the foreground.

- Location within Michigan
- Established: 1881
- Location: Kalamazoo, Michigan
- Coordinates: 42.29329°N 85.58392°W
- Type: History, Science, Technology
- Collection size: 50,000
- Director: Bill McElhone
- Website: Kalamazoo Valley Museum

The Kalamazoo Valley Museum is a "hands-on" museum in Kalamazoo, Michigan. The museum is largely aimed at families, and focuses on science, technology, and history. The museum is operated by Kalamazoo Valley Community College, and admission to the facility is free.

The museum's collection dates to an 1881 gift to the Kalamazoo School Board of corals, shells, and rocks from Horace M. Peck, a local banker. In its early years, the museum acquired natural history specimens, ethnographic materials, and antiquities. Currently, the collection includes over 50,000 items.

The museum has a state-of-the-art, 109-seat planetarium that screens a variety of presentations and programs for school groups and other public audiences.

== Exhibits ==
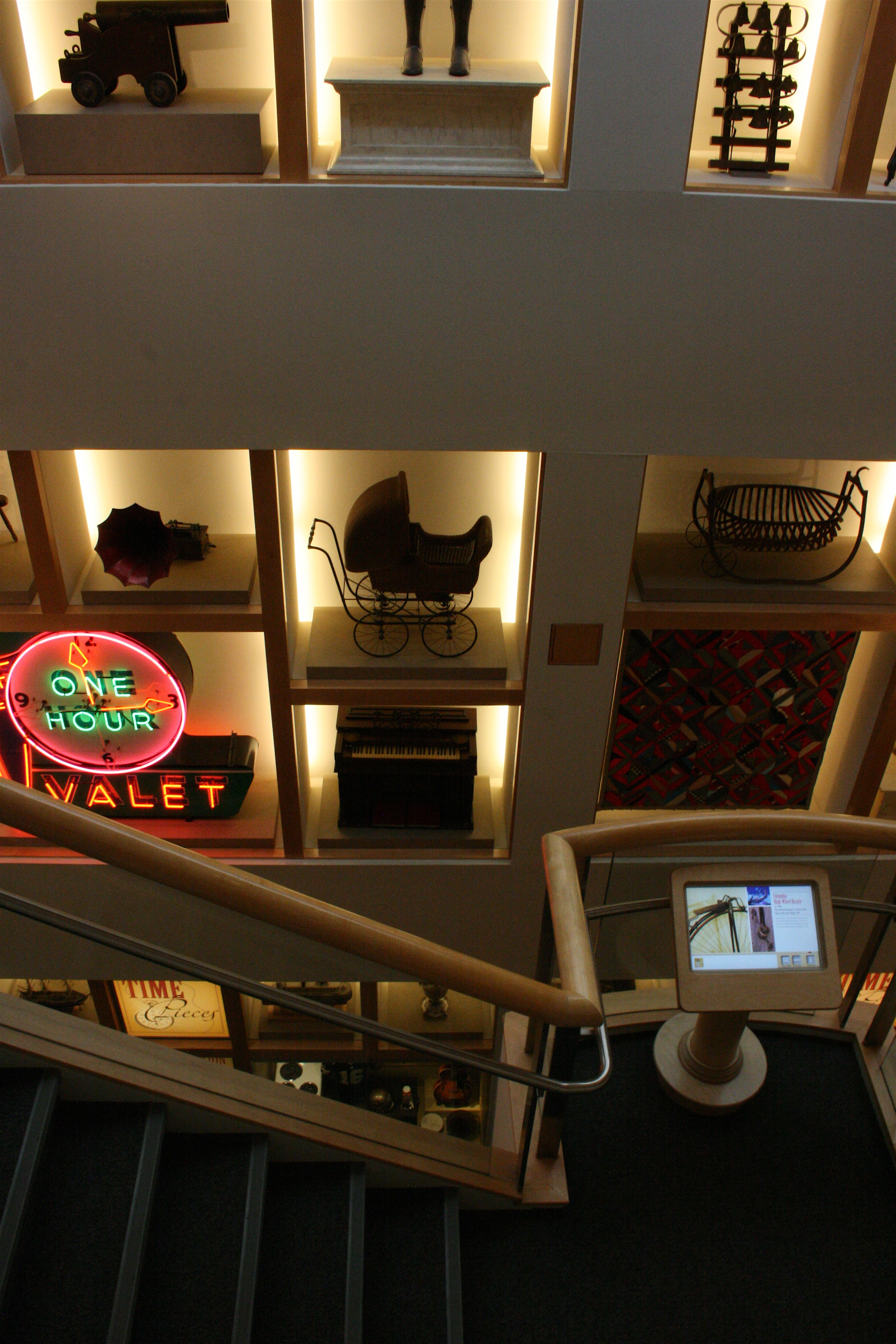
An inside display wall.

The museum, whose special exhibitions galleries feature an ever-changing variety of traveling exhibits, also features several permanent exhibits. These include:

- The Mystery of the Mummy: Centered on an unnamed 2,300-year-old Ptolemaic-era female ancient Egyptian mummy originating from the Akhmim region. It was donated to the museum in 1928. This exhibit also features the results of carbon dating, CT-scans, X-rays, and forensic reconstruction done on the mummy. This exhibit also includes artifacts from the museum's ancient Egyptian collection.
- Science in Motion: The hands-on exhibits in this gallery's three sections, Energy, Human Body, and Technology, invite visitors of all ages to participate in science by seeing, touching, feeling, hearing, and discovering.

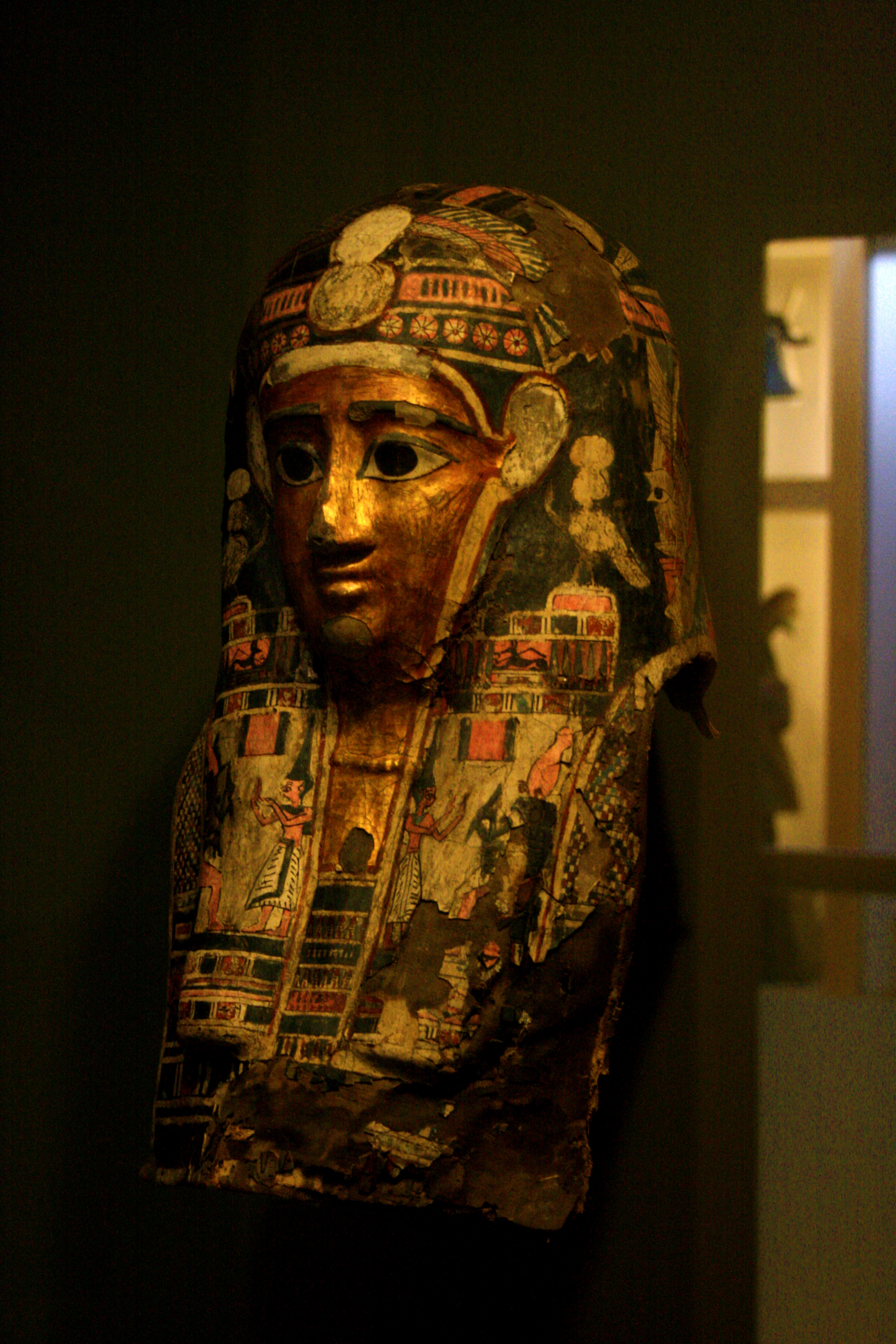
A sarcophagus in the mummy exhibit.

- On the Trail of History: The history and heritage of the city of Kalamazoo.
- Kalamazoo Direct To You: Kalamazoo products, including Gibson guitars, Kalamazoo stoves, Upjohn pharmaceuticals, Stryker orthopedic equipment and many more.
