= Kalamazoo Book Arts Center =

- Formation: 2005
- Purpose: Exploring the art of handmade paper, prints, books and the ideas within them
- Location: Kalamazoo, Michigan
- Website: kalbookarts.org

The Kalamazoo Book Arts Center (KBAC) is a nonprofit organization of artists and writers located in Kalamazoo, Michigan.

== History ==
KBAC was founded by Jeff Abshear in 2005 to create a community workshop and educational space focused on the arts of book design and printing, fine printmaking, papermaking, bookbinding, and creative writing. The center is located at the Park Trades Center on Kalamazoo Avenue in downtown Kalamazoo. The organization is supported by grants (including the National Endowment for the Arts), and community support.

== Programs ==
KBAC has regular on-site book arts workshops. KBAC created and hosts the "Poets in Print" reading series. KBAC participates in the Arts Council of Greater Kalamazoo's monthly Art Hop!
