= Latitude 42 Brewing Company =

Brewing company in Portage, Michigan, USA

- Type: American Brewery
- Location: Portage, Michigan
- Opened: 2013
- Total assets: owner = Portage Brewing Company LLC
- Website: www.latitude42brewingco.com

Latitude 42 Brewing Company is an American brewing company located in Portage, Michigan and was the first microbrewery to open in Portage. Latitude 42 Brewing Company opened its doors in 2013 and has produced more than 50 different varieties of beer since opening. In addition to the microbrewery, Latitude 42 has a restaurant and bar located at their Portage facility.

== History ==
In August 2012, master brewer Scott Freitas resigned as the Head Brewer at the Maui Brewing Co in Hawaii to open a brewing company in Portage, Michigan. With more than 20 years of brewing experience, Scott and co-founders Todd Neumann and Joe Stoddard designed and built the 11000 square foot Brewery and Restaurant. The Brewery was called Latitude 42 due to the geographical location of the brewery on the latitude line of 42 degrees and Scott hopes to open more breweries along this specific latitude line. The brewery opened in August 2013 with a menu of 14 beers and now has brewed, distributed and served more than 57 varieties of beer to date. Some varieties of their beer are available in cans. In 2018, they opened another location in Oshtemo, Michigan.

== Awards ==
In 2016, Latitude 42 Brewing Company won a Can Can award, which is an international beer competition focused on canned beers from the US and Canada. Latitude 42 won first place in the American Style Indian Pale Ale category with their I.P.EH! beer.

In 2015, Latitude 42 won the Michigan Brewery of the Year award at the New York International Beer Competition.

Latitude 42 has also won gold and silver medals for different beers at the U.S. Open Beer Championship, Los Angeles International Beer Competition, New York International Beer Competition, North American Brewers Association awards, and multiple others.
