= The Touch (radio network) =

- Type: Radio network
- Country: United States
- Availability: National
- Owner: Westwood One
- Former names: MyFavStation (2010)

The Touch is a 24-hour music format produced by Westwood One. It draws an adult audience between the ages of 25 and 49 with an Urban Adult Contemporary format since its inception by Satellite Music Network in 1972.

In January 2010, Citadel Broadcasting rebranded this network as MyFavStation, but a month later, it was reverted to its original legacy branding. That same month, veteran R&B radio announcer, Ron "The Nighttime Dog" Chavis, was brought in to host the seven-night-per-week evening slot vacated by R&B crooner Brian McKnight.

== Affiliates (partial list) ==
- Albany, Georgia – WQVE
- Demopolis, Alabama – WZNJ
- Gulf Breeze, Florida – WRNE
- Holton, Michigan – WVIB
- Portage, Michigan – WTOU
- Liberty, Mississippi – WAZA
- Vicksburg, Mississippi – KSBU
- Selma, Alabama – WJAM
- Friars Point, Mississippi – WNEV
- Marianna, Arkansas – KAKJ
- West Helena, Arkansas – KCLT
- Athens, Georgia – WXAG
- Hertford, North Carolina – WFMZ
- Erie, Pennsylvania – WXKC HD-2
- Decatur, Illinois – WYDS HD-2

== Former affiliates ==
- Grand Rapids, Michigan – WJNZ
- Natchez, Mississippi – KZKR
- Portage, Michigan – WTOU (1560 AM)
- Kalamazoo, Michigan - WTOU (1660 AM)
- San Antonio, Texas – KSJL AM 810 – 96.1 FM / 92.5 FM (early 1990s–2000s)
- Steubenville, Ohio – WIXZ
- St. Petersburg, Florida – WRBQ (AM) (1992–1999)
- Toledo, Ohio – WIMX
- Wilmington, North Carolina – WJSI
- Bronxville, New York – WNBM
- Harrisburg, Pennsylvania – WTCY, WNNK HD-2
- Mobile, Alabama – WZEW-HD3
- Oklahoma City, Oklahoma – KRMP
