= WTOU (disambiguation) =

WTOU may refer to:

- WTOU, a radio station (96.5 FM) in Portage, Michigan
- WZOX, a radio station (1660 AM) in Kalamazoo, Michigan, which held the call sign WTOU from 2020 to 2025
- WTOU (1560 AM), a defunct radio station in Portage, Michigan, which held the call sign WTOU from 2019 to 2020
- WFAT (AM), a radio station (930 AM) in Battle Creek, Michigan, which held the call sign WTOU from 2014 to 2019
- WARF, a radio station (1350 AM) in Akron, Ohio, which held the call sign WTOU from 1994 to 2005
