= WQLR =

WQLR may refer to:

- WQLR (FM), a radio station in Chateaugay, New York, United States
- WTOU (1560 AM), a defunct radio station in Portage, Michigan, which held the call sign WQLR from 2020 to 2021
- WTOU (AM), a radio station (1660 AM) in Kalamazoo, Michigan, which held the call sign WQLR from 2007 to 2020
- WVFM, a radio station (106.5 FM) in Kalamazoo, Michigan, which held the call sign WQLR from 1972 to 2007
