= WAWL =

WAWL may refer to:

- WAWL-LP, a radio station (103.5 FM) licensed to serve Grand Haven, Michigan, United States
- WJBP, a radio station (91.5 FM) licensed to serve Red Bank, Tennessee, United States, which held the call sign WAWL-FM from 1987 to 2008
