= WWKN =

WWKN may refer to former call signs of radio stations:

- WWKN (2007–2023) of WKLX, Kentucky radio station
- WWKN, 1996 of WBFN, Michigan radio station
- WWKN (1997–2006) of WBXX, Michigan radio station
