= WNWN =

WNWN can refer to:

- WNWN (FM), a radio station (98.5 FM) licensed to Coldwater, Michigan, United States
- WTOU (1560 AM), a defunct radio station licensed to Portage, Michigan, which held the call sign WNWN from 1995 to 2019
