= WFAT (disambiguation) =

WFAT may refer to:

- WFAT (AM), a radio station (930 AM) licensed to serve Battle Creek, Michigan, United States
- WQVD, a radio station (700 AM) licensed to serve Orange-Athol, Massachusetts, United States, which held the call sign WFAT from 2014 to 2019
- WZOX, a radio station (96.5 FM) licensed to serve Portage, Michigan, United States, which held the call sign WFAT from 1992 to 2008
- WPKD-TV, a television station (channel 11/PSIP 19) licensed to serve Jeanette, Pennsylvania, United States, which held the call sign WFAT-TV from 1983 to 1988
