= WELL-FM =

Waverly, Alabama; United States
- Broadcast area: Auburn-Opelika, Alabama Columbus, Georgia
- Frequency: 88.7 MHz
- Branding: Praise 88.7

Programming
- Format: Christian Contemporary

Ownership
- Owner: Alabama Christian Radio; (Alabama Christian Radio, Inc.)
- Sister stations: WJHO

History
- First air date: 1991
- Former call signs: WDVI (1989–1997)

Technical information
- Licensing authority: FCC
- Facility ID: 64562
- Class: C1
- ERP: 60,000 watts
- HAAT: 129 meters (423 ft)
- Transmitter coordinates: 32°51′20″N 85°46′31″W

Links
- Public license information: Public file; LMS
- Webcast: Listen Live
- Website: Praise887.com

WELL-FM (88.7 FM) is a radio station licensed to serve Waverly, Alabama, United States. The station is owned by Alabama Christian Radio and the broadcast license is held by Alabama Christian Radio, Inc. It airs a Contemporary Christian music format.

The station was assigned the WELL-FM call letters by the Federal Communications Commission on August 22, 1997.

The WELL-FM calls were used for many years at the station on 104.9 FM in Marshall, Michigan, now known as WBXX, and previous to that on the station now known as WKFR in nearby Battle Creek.
