= WKZO =

WKZO may refer to:

- WKZO (AM), a radio station (590 AM) licensed to serve Kalamazoo, Michigan, United States
- WZOX, a radio station (96.5 FM) licensed to serve Portage, Michigan, which held the call sign WKZO-FM from 2010 to 2013
- WWMT, a television station (channel 8, virtual 3) licensed to serve Kalamazoo, Michigan, which held the call sign WKZO-TV from 1950 to 1985
