= WUFN =

- Albion, Michigan; United States
- Broadcast area: Jackson, Michigan; Battle Creek, Michigan
- Frequency: 96.7 MHz
- Branding: Family Life Radio

Programming
- Format: Christian
- Affiliations: Family Life Radio

Ownership
- Owner: Family Life Communications; (Family Life Broadcasting System)

History
- First air date: 1971; 55 years ago
- Former call signs: WALM-FM

Technical information
- Licensing authority: FCC
- Facility ID: 20630
- Class: A
- ERP: 3,200 watts
- HAAT: 139 meters (456 ft)
- Transmitter coordinates: 42°15′56.1″N 84°38′42.9″W

Links
- Public license information: Public file; LMS
- Website: myflr.org

Simulcast
- WUNN
- Mason, Michigan; United States
- Broadcast area: Lansing, Michigan
- Frequency: 1110 kHz

Ownership
- Owner: Family Life Communications; (Family Life Broadcasting System)

History
- First air date: 1960s
- Call sign meaning: A pun on "one"

Technical information
- Facility ID: 20650
- Class: D
- Power: 1,000 watts (daytime)
- Transmitter coordinates: 42°33′6.7″N 84°24′18.9″W

Links
- Public license information: Public file; LMS

WUFN (96.7 FM) is a radio station in Albion, Michigan and WUNN (1110 AM) is a radio station in Mason, Michigan. Both are non-commercial, Christian stations owned by Family Life Radio.

Family Life Radio began in 1966 with a half-hour Christian program aimed at teenagers airing on WIBM-FM (now WWDK) on 94.1 in Jackson, Michigan. Warren and Char Bolthouse, founders of Family Life Radio, produced the program in a studio in the basement of their home on Jericho Road near the Kibby Road studio of WIBM. WIBM-FM had begun broadcasting in 1955, but was simulcasting WIBM-AM and had very few listeners.

Soon Warren and Char Bolthouse convinced Booth Broadcasting, the owners of WIBM, to allow them to program the station full-time. Since few people had FM radios in the mid-1960s, they agreed and Family Life Radio began programming the station from the studio in the middle of the Bolthouse basement. Listenership grew as churches in the Jackson area began to encourage their members to purchase an FM radio and tune in to the broadcasts.

As FM radio sales increased, Booth told Family Life Radio that he would resume control of the station programming. Family Life Radio looked to Mason, Michigan, half-way between Lansing and Jackson for the location of its first station. WUNN was founded in the late 1960s as a 1,000 watt daytime only AM station.

Family Life Radio began looking into the possibility of adding an FM station in the Jackson area so they could get better coverage in the area and provide programming during the night hours. Otis Meyer donated a piece of property to the station near Albion next to the I-94 freeway. A station license was purchased from WALM-FM who then built a new WALM-FM (now WBXX) on 104.9 in nearby Marshall, Michigan. Soon the tower of WUFN rose on the property and the station began operation in 1971 at 96.7 MHz from a trailer parked on the site. The trailer continued to be used until it was replaced by a Colonial style building in 1991. In December 2003 WUFN increased power from 1,500 watts to 3,200 watts. In 2005 a 36-watt translator began operating on 95.1 in Kalamazoo, Michigan.

Former logo

After trying a Southern Gospel format on WUNN, it was decided to no longer provide separate programming and WUNN began simulcasting WUFN in 2006.

WUNN and WUFN were the first two stations in the Family Life Radio network that now includes 40 stations in Michigan, Arizona, New Mexico, Texas, Wisconsin, Tennessee, Georgia, Florida, Kansas, and California. Other Michigan stations are WUGN 99.7 MHz Midland, Michigan. WUFN is also simulcasting on WBFN 1400 AM in Battle Creek, which is currently in Clear Channel Communications' Aloha Station Trust and is being gifted to Family Life Radio.

== Translators ==
In addition to the main station, WUFN is relayed by an additional two translators to widen its broadcast area.

Call sign	Frequency	City of license	FID	ERP (W)	Class	FCC info	Notes
W260BX	99.9 FM	Lansing, Michigan	140610	190	D	LMS	Relays WUNN

NOTE: W260BX lists WUNN-AM 1110 as its primary operating station.
