= WKMI =

- Kalamazoo, Michigan; United States
- Broadcast area: (Daytime) (Nighttime)
- Frequency: 1360 KHz
- Branding: 1360 The Ticket

Programming
- Format: Sports Radio
- Affiliations: ESPN Radio

Ownership
- Owner: Townsquare Media; (Townsquare License, LLC)
- Sister stations: WKFR-FM, WRKR

History
- First air date: August 8, 1947
- Former call signs: WGFG (1947–1952)
- Call sign meaning: Kalamazoo, Michigan

Technical information
- Licensing authority: FCC
- Facility ID: 14659
- Class: B
- Power: 5,000 watts day 1,000 watts night
- Transmitter coordinates: 42°19′36″N 85°31′33″W

Links
- Public license information: Public file; LMS
- Webcast: Listen Live
- Website: wkmi.com/

WKMI (1360 kHz) is a radio station licensed to Kalamazoo, Michigan, United States, owned by Townsquare Media. Programming includes syndicated sports talk programs originating from WXYT in Detroit branded as The Ticket as well as ESPN Radio programming nights and weekends.

WKMI is an affiliate of the Grand Valley State Laker football radio network.

WKMI, which began broadcasting on August 8, 1947, as WGFG, was a highly rated Top 40 music station from the 1950s through the 1970s. The station moved to an Adult Contemporary format to compete with WKZO during the early 1980s, and then switched to its current talk format in 1990 as the Persian Gulf War created a boom for talk radio.

WKMI's logo as a talk station.

An FM sister at 106.5 was added in 1964; WKMI-FM is now WVFM and no longer co-owned, as of June 25, 1972.

On August 30, 2013, a deal was announced in which Townsquare Media would acquire 53 stations from Cumulus Media, including WKMI, for $238 million. The deal was part of Cumulus' acquisition of Dial Global; Townsquare and Dial Global were both controlled by Oaktree Capital Management. The sale to Townsquare was completed on November 14, 2013.

WKMI began airing a sports-talk format December 1st, 2025 as an inaugural affiliate of the Detroit Sports Network. The network is a partnership between Audacy's 97.1 WXYT-FM in Detroit and several Townsquare Media stations in Michigan including WKMI, WJIM in Lansing, WFGR in Grand Rapids, and WBCK in Battle Creek.
