= WAUS =

Coordinates: 41.962°N 86.351°W

- Berrien Springs, Michigan; United States
- Broadcast area: Michiana - South Bend metropolitan area
- Frequency: 90.7 MHz
- Branding: WAUS 90.7 FM

Programming
- Format: Classical
- Affiliations: NPR

Ownership
- Owner: Andrews University

History
- First air date: January 10, 1971
- Call sign meaning: Andrews UniverSity

Technical information
- Licensing authority: FCC
- Facility ID: 2241
- Class: B
- ERP: 50,000 watts
- HAAT: 150 meters (492 ft)

Links
- Public license information: Public file; LMS
- Webcast: Listen Live
- Website: waus.org

WAUS (90.7 FM) is a non-commercial radio station licensed to Berrien Springs, Michigan, and broadcasting to the Michiana and South Bend metropolitan area. It is owned by Andrews University and airs a classical music radio format. It carries NPR News or BBC News at the top of most hours with some religious programming on the weekends.

== History ==
WAUS first signed on the air on January 10, 1971. It was originally powered at 17,000 watts, about half its current output. The original station manager was Mike Mottler, with Carsten Thomsen as the operations director.

But Andrews University traces its involvement in broadcasting back to the 1920s. According to its website, an experimental radio station with the call sign 8AZ went on the air at Emmanuel Missionary College (Andrews University's previous name) in 1921. It received a commercial license two years later as KFGZ. It called itself "The Radio Lighthouse," airing religious and general programs. KFGZ could be heard in those early days of broadcasting around Michigan and Indiana, with some reports of it being picked up in Europe, Hawaii and New Zealand. It later changed its calls to WEMC. Due to the Great Depression, the funds to run the station ran low, and the college sold it to its founder and manager, John Fetzer, who moved it to Kalamazoo as WKZO.

In 1967, Andrews University began planning for a new non-commercial FM station. Robert E. Upton of the Whirlpool Corporation headed up a capital campaign. Built with money raised from the community and a substantial amount provided by John Fetzer, radio station WAUS signed on the air on January 10, 1971. By 1980, the power had been increased to its current 50,000 watts.

Previous logo
