= WBXX =

WBXX may refer to:

- WBXX (FM), a radio station (104.9 FM) licensed to Marshall, Michigan, United States
- WBXX-TV, a television station (channel 31, virtual channel 20) licensed to Crossville, Tennessee, United States
