= WBCK =

Coordinates: 42.288°N 85.165°W

- Battle Creek, Michigan; United States
- Frequency: 95.3 MHz
- Branding: 95.3 The Ticket

Programming
- Format: Sports Radio
- Affiliations: ESPN Radio

Ownership
- Owner: Townsquare Media; (Townsquare License, LLC)
- Sister stations: WBXX

History
- First air date: March 1975
- Former call signs: WBCK-FM (9/8/07–7/10/14); WBXX (10/26/89–9/18/07); WMJC (4/30/87–10/26/89); WMKG (2/5/86–4/30/87); WDFP (5/20/75–2/5/86)
- Call sign meaning: "Battle Creek"

Technical information
- Licensing authority: FCC
- Facility ID: 37461
- Class: A
- ERP: 3,000 watts
- HAAT: 82 meters

Links
- Public license information: Public file; LMS
- Webcast: Listen Live
- Website: wbckfm.com

WBCK (95.3 FM) is a radio station in Battle Creek, Michigan, United States, owned by Townsquare Media. Programming includes syndicated sports talk programs originating from WXYT in Detroit branded as The Ticket as well as ESPN Radio programming nights and weekends.

== History ==
WBCK began broadcasting with 1,000 watts on AM 930 in Battle Creek and surrounding areas of West Michigan. It featured a full-service MOR/adult contemporary format for years, evolving into news/talk by the mid-1990s.

Two brothers, Robert and David Holmes formed Michigan Broadcasting Company, and it went on the air at 8:00 pm on Friday, July 9, 1948. After some comments on the new radio station from local dignitaries, the owners, and the staff, the station went into a broadcast of a Detroit Tigers game. WBCK was originally an affiliate of the Mutual Broadcasting System but in recent years has been a FOX News radio affiliate.

The radio station originally originated its broadcasts from the Security National Bank Building (now "The Milton") in downtown Battle Creek. A fire destroyed the studios in 1958. After the fire, WBCK relocated to the transmitter site on Golden Avenue, just south of downtown. The location was chosen because of its close proximity to downtown Battle Creek, and the fact that the high ground would be good to locate an FM or TV station. While other FM stations, and even another AM station, broadcast from the Golden Ave. site over the years along with WBCK, WBCK-TV never came to fruition.

WBCK, along with WBXX, moved out of the studios on Golden Ave. in February 2022.

=== WMJC as Magic 95 ===
When 95.3 FM signed on in 1975 with the call letters WDFP, the owner was Donald F. Price and the format was Christian music and religious programming. In 1986 the station was sold to Capstar Broadcasting.

With an ERP of 3,000 watts, 95.3 could be reached as far west as Kalamazoo and was changed to a top-40 station as WMKG then switched to WMJC as "Magic 95" these calls came from 94.7 FM in Detroit now WCSX. The ratings proved the best of this frequency has seen. Top-40 powerhouse WKFR was dominant mostly due to its signal on 103.3 FM which reached as far as Jackson to Benton Harbor. In the late 1980s the station began to take a more rhythmic sound similar to how WGRD was in the 1990s. Capstar introduced the station as "B95" WBXX.

=== WBXX as B95 ===
As WBXX "B95", 95.3 FM was a very popular CHR-top 40 station in the late 1980s and early 1990s. Despite the station's high ratings (especially with younger listeners), B95 was unsuccessful in terms of revenue because it played hip hop and rap music that was unpopular with local advertisers. This led the station to change format to oldies and later adult contemporary; the latter format continued on 104.9 FM until 2016 when they flipped to alternative rock.

=== News-Talk ===
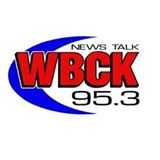
WBCK's logo as a news-talk station.

The sale of the Battle Creek Radio Group from Clear Channel Communications has been completed. 95.3 began to simulcast with WBCK (930 AM) and WBXX began broadcasting on 104.9 (formerly WRCC). 95.3 FM became the permanent home of WBCK's news-talk format.

On March 21, 2008, AM 930 and FM 95.3 stopped the simulcast between both stations, while AM 930 began airing a classic country station as Country 93.

On August 30, 2013, a deal was announced in which Townsquare Media would acquire 53 Cumulus Media stations, including WBCK-FM, for $238 million. The deal was part of Cumulus' acquisition of Dial Global; Townsquare and Dial Global were both controlled by Oaktree Capital Management. The sale to Townsquare was completed on November 14, 2013. The "-FM" suffix was dropped from the station's call sign on July 10, 2014, after 930 AM (which by this point had been sold separately to Midwest Communications) changed callsigns to WTOU.

=== Sports-Talk ===
WBCK began airing a sports-talk format December 1st, 2025 as an inaugural affiliate of the Detroit Sports Network. The network is a partnership between Audacy's 97.1 WXYT-FM in Detroit and several Townsquare Media stations in Michigan including WBCK, WJIM in Lansing, WFGR in Grand Rapids, and WKMI in Kalamazoo.
