= KLFH =

KLFH may refer to:

- KLFH (FM), a radio station (90.7 FM) licensed to serve Fort Smith, Arkansas, United States
- KLFH, formerly a radio station (89.5 FM) licensed to serve Ojai, California, United States, which held the call sign KLFH from 2003 to 2014; see KLFF (FM) § KLFH
