= WKNR (disambiguation) =

WKNR may refer to:

- WDTW (AM), a radio station (1310 AM) licensed to Dearborn, Michigan, United States, which identified as WKNR from 1963 to 1972
- WBFN, a radio station (1400 AM) licensed to Battle Creek, Michigan, United States, which identified as WKNR from 1972 to 1988
- WHKW, a radio station (1220 AM) licensed to Cleveland, Ohio, United States, which identified as WKNR from 1990 to 2001
- WKNR, a radio station (850 AM) licensed to Cleveland, Ohio, United States, which has identified as WKNR since 2001
- WNIC, a radio station (100.3 FM) licensed to Dearborn, Michigan, United States, which identified as WKNR-FM from 1963 to 1972
