= KFR =

KFR may refer to:

- Kettle Falls International Railway, a railroad operating in Washington and British Columbia
- WKFR-FM, a radio station serving Kalamazoo, Michigan
- The file format and extension used by Kalles Fraktaler
- Knattspyrnufélag Rangæinga, an Icelandic football club
