= WTOU (1560 AM) =

Radio station in Portage–Kalamazoo, Michigan

Coordinates: 42°10′59″N 85°35′30″W

Portage, Michigan; United States
- Frequency: 1560 kHz
- Branding: The Touch

Programming
- Format: Defunct (was urban adult contemporary)
- Affiliations: The Touch

Ownership
- Owner: Midwest Communications
- Sister stations: WKZO, WNWN, WQLR, WVFM, WZOX

History
- First air date: July 25, 1966
- Last air date: January 5, 2021
- Former call signs: WTPS (1966–1973); WBUK (1973–1985); WHEZ (1985–1995); WNWN (1995–2019); WTOU (2019–2020); WQLR (2020–2021)
- Call sign meaning: W TOUch

Technical information
- Facility ID: 67767
- Class: D
- Power: 4,100 watts day
- Translator: 95.5 W238AL (Portage)

WTOU (1560 AM) was the call sign assigned from 2019 until 2020, and the last call sign used on the air, by a radio station licensed to Portage, Michigan. It last broadcast an urban adult contemporary format, provided by ABC Radio Networks (The Touch, or "Today's R&B and Old School"). Owned by Midwest Communications, the station served the greater Kalamazoo, Michigan area. The station was assigned the call letters WQLR by the Federal Communications Commission on December 18, 2020, but its license was deleted without any broadcasts being made under the WQLR call letters.

WTOU was also heard in Portage/Kalamazoo on FM translator 95.5 W238AL. Because the station was only licensed for daytime operation, the translator allowed "The Touch" programming to continue after WTOU signed off for the night. This translator was formerly used to relay country sister station WNWN-FM based in Battle Creek, but when another sister station, 96.5 WFAT, was switched to country music as WYZO, W238AL changed its programming source from WNWN-FM to the then-WNWN. W238AL was the third FM translator in Michigan to relay an AM station, after stations in Big Rapids and Charlevoix/Petoskey.

== History ==
The station had a Top 40 format as WTPS in the 1960s, a country station as WBUK in the 1970s and 1980s (except for a brief period as an oldies station in 1981-1982), and a beautiful music station as WHEZ.

On September 12, 2019, sister station 930 AM WTOU (now WFAT) in Battle Creek and FM translator W274AQ broke away from the simulcast and flipped to classic hits.

On December 18, 2020, WTOU swapped call signs with AM 1660 WQLR, and signed off forever after playing the national anthem of the United States of America by Whitney Houston and The Florida Orchestra. AM 1560's license was then surrendered and cancelled on January 5, 2021. Translator W238AL then began simulcasting 1660 AM, with that station now holding the WTOU callsign.
