= WTOU =

Coordinates: 42.215°N 85.610°W

- Portage, Michigan; United States
- Broadcast area: Battle Creek, Michigan; Kalamazoo, Michigan
- Frequency: 96.5 MHz
- Branding: 96.5 WTOU

Programming
- Format: Urban AC

Ownership
- Owner: Midwest Communications; (Midwest Communications, Inc.)
- Sister stations: WKZO, WZOX, WNWN, WVFM, WFAT

History
- First air date: December 1988 (as WLWJ)
- Former call signs: WLWJ (1988–1989); WUBU (1989–1992); WFAT (1992–2008); WYZO (2008–2010); WKZO-FM (2010–2013); WZOX (2013-2025)
- Call sign meaning: W KalamaZOo X (previous format)

Technical information
- Licensing authority: FCC
- Facility ID: 67775
- Class: A
- ERP: 6,000 watts
- HAAT: 76 meters (249 ft)

Links
- Public license information: Public file; LMS
- Webcast: Listen Live
- Website: 965wtou.com

WTOU (96.5 FM) is a radio station in Portage, Michigan. The station currently broadcasts an urban adult contemporary format branded as "96.5 WTOU".

== History ==
=== Early history ===
96.5 FM signed on in December 1988 as WLWJ owned by Larry Langford, Jr. Langford owned stations in Chicago and South Bend such as WVON and WLLJ/910 (now WGTO). WLWJ was mixed of a Rhythm leaning oldies rock station.

=== 96.5 UBU ===
In February 1991, the calls were changed to WUBU, as "96.5 UBU" with an urban adult contemporary format. WUBU, owned by Larry Langford, Jr. (who owned a similarly formatted station in Cassopolis, WLLJ-AM 910, now classic hits WGTO and still owned by Langford) was Kalamazoo's first FM R&B station and was highly supported, mostly from students on Western Michigan University's campus.

In June 1992, the station was bought out by Tri-State Broadcasting, Inc., after WUBU was unable to generate enough revenue to support itself. The WUBU calls were dropped as well as the urban AC format. (The WUBU call letters and format were eventually picked up by 106.3 FM in South Bend, Indiana.) Throughout the years, there have been attempts for another FM R&B station. Today, Midwest Communications operates WTOU (1660 AM) with a similar format to that of WUBU.

=== 96.5 The Fat One/WFAT (AC and Classic Rock) ===
On June 9, 1992, the station acquired the calls WFAT and switched its format to oldies, then all-1970s hits, then classic hits, and finally to Hot AC as 96.5 The Fat One. In the late-1990s, the station flirted with a CHR/Pop format briefly in competition with WKFR. By April 2000, the station switched its format to mainstream AC with Rick Dees coming to the station for mornings, Robb Rose as Program Director/Middays, Chris in the afternoon, and Delilah at night.

The mainstream AC format did not last long against WQLR and WOOD-FM, and on October 7, 2001, it became a classic rock station with the syndicated Bob and Tom Show in the morning drive. Midwest Communications purchased WFAT, as well as WNWN-AM and WNWN-FM From Tri-State Broadcasting.

=== Y96.5/WKZO ===
On February 15, 2008, at 5 p.m., the station abruptly flipped to country music. The last song on WFAT was "Happy Trails" by Van Halen, after which the station became "Y96.5", with the first song of the new format being "It's Five O'Clock Somewhere" by Alan Jackson and Jimmy Buffett. A couple of days later, the station changed its callsign to WYZO.

On March 31, 2010, the station underwent changes again, dropping the country format in favor of a simulcast of its sister station WKZO (590 AM) which airs a news/talk format. The call sign was also changed to WKZO-FM to mirror its AM counterpart on April 5, 2010.

=== Z 96.5/96.5 Jack FM/Hits 96.5 ===
On May 13, 2013, WKZO-FM flipped to alternative rock, branded as "Z 96.5". On May 15, 2013, WKZO-FM changed their call letters to WZOX.

On November 2, 2018, WZOX flipped to variety hits as "96.5 Jack FM".

On February 24, 2021, the "Jack FM" format moved to WVFM (106.5 FM). On March 3, at noon, after a week of simulcasting, WZOX flipped to top 40/CHR as "Hits 96.5", with the first song being "Savage Love (Laxed – Siren Beat)" by Jawsh 685 and Jason Derulo.

On February 28, 2022, WZOX shifted from top 40/CHR to modern adult contemporary, still under the "Hits 96.5" branding.

=== 96.5 WTOU ===
On March 28, 2025, WZOX changed their format from modern adult contemporary to urban adult contemporary, branded as "96.5 WTOU" under new WTOU call letters.

== Bronco Radio Network ==
After signing a five-year contract, the station will resume its relationship with Western Michigan University in the fall of 2010 as the flagship station for Broncos football, men's basketball and men's hockey. Previously, while operating as WFAT, the station was the flagship station for football and men's basketball from the 1996-1997 season to the 2006-2007 season.
