= KCLT =

- West Helena, Arkansas; United States
- Frequency: 104.9 MHz
- Branding: Force 3 Radio

Programming
- Format: Urban adult contemporary
- Affiliations: Westwood One

Ownership
- Owner: West Helena Broadcasters Inc.
- Sister stations: KAKJ, WNEV

History
- First air date: 1984

Technical information
- Facility ID: 71608
- Class: A
- ERP: 6,000 watts
- HAAT: 91 meters (299 ft)
- Transmitter coordinates: 34°30′56″N 90°40′13″W

Links
- Webcast: Listen Live
- Website: Official website

KCLT (104.9 FM, "Force 3 Radio") is a radio station broadcasting an urban adult contemporary music format. Licensed to West Helena, Arkansas, United States, the station is currently owned by West Helena Broadcasters Inc. and features programming from Westwood One.

== History ==
The Federal Communications Commission granted the station a construction permit on July 2, 1984. The station was assigned the KCLT call sign on July 23, 1984, and was issued its license to cover on July 10, 1986.
