= WJTG =

- Fort Valley, Georgia; United States
- Broadcast area: Macon–Warner Robins
- Frequency: 91.3 MHz
- Branding: Family Life Radio

Programming
- Format: Christian contemporary music and preaching
- Network: Family Life Radio

Ownership
- Owner: Family Life Broadcasting, Inc.

Technical information
- Licensing authority: FCC
- Facility ID: 32358
- Class: C1
- ERP: 100,000 watts
- HAAT: 140 meters (460 ft)
- Transmitter coordinates: 32°41′27″N 83°51′46″W

Links
- Public license information: Public file; LMS
- Webcast: Listen live
- Website: myflr.org

WJTG is a Christian radio station affiliate of Family Life Radio, licensed to Fort Valley, Georgia, broadcasting on 91.3 FM, and serving the Macon–Warner Robins area. The station's format consists of Christian contemporary music and Christian talk and teaching.
