= KJTY =

Radio station in Topeka, Kansas

Coordinates: 39.0392°N 95.4500°W

Topeka, Kansas; United States
- Broadcast area: Topeka, Kansas; Lawrence, Kansas; Kansas City, Kansas
- Frequency: 88.1 MHz
- Branding: 88.1, Family Life Radio

Programming
- Format: Contemporary Christian
- Affiliations: Family Life Radio

Ownership
- Owner: Family Life Communications; (Family Life Broadcasting, Inc.)

History
- First air date: 1985

Technical information
- Licensing authority: FCC
- Class: C1
- ERP: 75,000 watts
- HAAT: 234 meters (768 ft)

Links
- Public license information: Public file; LMS
- Website: www.myflr.org

KJTY is a non-commercial Christian FM radio station in Topeka, Kansas, operating on 88.1 MHz. The station broadcasts with 75,000 watts from a 768-foot tower giving it a strong signal throughout eastern Kansas.

== History ==
KJTY "Joy 88" logo from 2000.

KJTY signed on as a locally owned religious station in 1985, Joy 88, owned by Joy Public Broadcasting. They had a few local programs and nighttime programming came from the Moody Broadcasting Network. On May 25, 2007, Joy sold the station to Family Life Communications, which made the station a part of its 12-station Family Life Radio network.
