= KFLR-FM =

Family Life Radio station in Phoenix

- Phoenix, Arizona; United States
- Broadcast area: Phoenix metropolitan area
- Frequency: 90.3 MHz (HD Radio)
- Branding: 90.3 Family Life Radio

Programming
- Format: Christian contemporary and talk and teaching
- Affiliations: Family Life Radio

Ownership
- Owner: Family Life Broadcasting, Inc.

History
- First air date: December 1985
- Call sign meaning: Family Life Radio

Technical information
- Licensing authority: FCC
- Facility ID: 20638
- Class: C
- ERP: 100,000 watts
- HAAT: 483 meters (1,585 ft)
- Transmitter coordinates: 33°20′2″N 112°3′44″W

Links
- Public license information: Public file; LMS
- Webcast: Listen live
- Website: www.myflr.org

KFLR-FM (90.3 FM) is a non-commercial radio station licensed to Phoenix, Arizona, United States. It is owned and operated by the Tucson-based Family Life Radio network. It airs a contemporary Christian radio format with some talk and teaching programs.

KFLR-FM's transmitter is sited on TV Road in South Mountain Park and Reservation in Phoenix. It has four FM translators to relay the station to communities in Central and Northern Arizona.

== History ==
KFLR-FM signed on the air in December 1985. It has been owned by Family Life Radio since its debut, with the network acquiring the construction permit in 1978. It took seven years to build the station and its tower.

== Translators ==
Broadcast translators for KFLR-FM
Call sign	Frequency	City of license	FID	ERP (W)	Class	FCC info
K265DN	89.9 FM	Flagstaff, Arizona		10	D	
K247BH	97.3 FM	Goodyear, Arizona	147044	40	D	LMS
K294AN	106.7 FM	Payson, Arizona	20655	12	D	LMS
K228DF	93.5 FM	Prescott, Arizona	20633	77	D	LMS
