= WTVB =

Radio station in Coldwater, Michigan

Coordinates: 41°54′34″N 85°00′21″W

- Coldwater, Michigan; United States
- Broadcast area: (Daytime) (Nighttime)
- Frequency: 1590 kHz
- Branding: The Voice of Branch County

Programming
- Format: Full service/Classic hits
- Affiliations: Classic Hits Total (Westwood One)

Ownership
- Owner: Midwest Communications; (Midwest Communications, Inc.)

History
- First air date: August 6, 1949
- Call sign meaning: We're The Voice of Branch County (formerly Twin Valley Broadcasters)

Technical information
- Licensing authority: FCC
- Facility ID: 67757
- Class: B
- Power: 5,000 watts day 1,000 watts night
- Translator: 95.5 W238CD (Coldwater)

Links
- Public license information: Public file; LMS
- Website: wtvbam.com

WTVB (1590 AM) is a regional radio station located in Coldwater, Michigan. It carries largely classic hits and local news and sports, with Westwood One as its source for national news, and carries Westwood One's Classic Hits Total format. Midwest Communications owns WTVB.

The call letters originally stood for Twin Valley Broadcasters and are in no way connected to any television station, although the station bills itself as "The Voice of Branch County. The "valleys" mentioned (ironically Coldwater is in one of the highest parts of southern Lower Michigan) are apparently the short Coldwater River and the St. Joseph River in south-central Michigan.

WNWN/98.5 "WIN 98-5," licensed to Coldwater and now a country music station primarily targeting the Battle Creek and Kalamazoo areas, was originally WTVB-FM at 98.3, the FM signal that duplicated WTVB when FM radio was new.

WTVB was known as 16/TVB for many years. Even 20+ years after that campaign was stopped, and WTVB was officially known as AM 1590 WTVB, local community members have been known to still refer to the station as 16/TVB.

== History ==
WTVB's call letters were assigned in early 1949 to Twin Valley Broadcasters Inc. for a new AM station at 1590 kHz in Coldwater, originally listed with 1,000 watts daytime. A June 1949 item in Broadcasting reported that the station planned to begin broadcasting around July 1, 1949. The item said WTVB was housed in a new cinder-block building about 1.5 miles south of Coldwater on U.S. Route 27, used a Gates transmitter and console, and had two 188-foot Wincharger towers. E. H. Munn Jr. was identified as station director and chief engineer. Radio historian Scott Fybush later described WTVB as Coldwater's local AM outlet and "a venerable local voice dating back to 1949", writing that the call letters have been interpreted as either "Twin Valley Broadcasting" or "The Voice of Branch (County)".

Twin Valley Broadcasters also pursued a television station in Coldwater. The 1952 edition of Television Factbook listed an application by Twin Valley Broadcasters Inc. (WTVB) for UHF Channel 24, with 2.1 kW visual power, 1.12 kW aural power, and a proposed transmitter site south of Coldwater on U.S. 27. WTVB also had an FM sister station. A 1958 FM allocation list showed WTVB-FM at 98.3 MHz in Coldwater, and in 1964 the station's FM sister changed call letters from WTVB-FM to WANG(FM).

In 1962, WTVB was one of several regional-channel AM stations that petitioned the Federal Communications Commission to allow Class III regional AM stations to operate with as much as 25 kW instead of the 5 kW limit. The FCC denied the petitions, citing interference concerns and limited practical service improvement.

The station's first major ownership change came in 1968, when Twin Valley Broadcasters sought to assign the licenses of WTVB and WANG(FM) to Zarc Inc. for $290,000. The FCC Broadcast Bureau granted the assignment on March 29, 1968.

In 1971, Harold W. Shepard and Harry Wilber sold WTVB and WANG(FM) to Tri State Broadcasting Co. for $260,000. Paul R. Ruse was identified as Tri State's president and majority stockholder. At the time, WTVB was listed as operating full-time on 1590 kHz with 5 kW daytime and 1 kW nighttime, while WANG(FM) was listed on 98.5 MHz with 50 kW.

Longtime WTVB news director Jim Whelan was hired by Paul and Mirt Ruse at Tri State Broadcasting in 1974. Whelan served nearly 42 years as a reporter, anchor and news director before announcing his retirement in 2016. WTVB later became part of Midwest Communications. A 1996 Broadcasting & Cable station-trading report listed WTVB as part of a $4 million transaction in which Midwest Communications Inc. acquired WHEZ(AM)-WFAT-FM Portage, WTVB(AM) Coldwater and WNWN-FM Kalamazoo from Tri-State Broadcasting Co. Inc.

WTVB added FM translator service on 95.5 MHz through W238CD in Coldwater. The FCC granted Midwest Communications a license to cover for W238CD on February 10, 2012. Midwest Communications lists WTVB as "WTVB AM 1590 and FM 95.5", branded "The Voice of Branch County", with a full-service/classic hits format. The station's programming has continued to emphasize local news, sports and community information. WTVB's website says Ken Delaney came to Coldwater in 1984 and serves as market manager, program director and morning host, while Jim Measel first came to WTVB in 1991 and covers local news and sports.

== Translator ==
In 2011, Midwest Communications secured an FM translator from Christian broadcaster, Family Stations, Inc., and by January 13, 2012, WTVB was once again broadcasting on FM, at 95.5 MHz. With the addition of the translator, the station was able to provide programming to more areas of Branch County that were not able to receive a reliable signal from AM 1590 at night.

== Programming ==
Local programming on WTVB consists of a morning show, "Midday Journal" and "Evening Journal". The News Department covers Branch County with breaking news and updates. The Sports Department covers local high school sports with up-to-the-minute status updates, and live broadcasts. Traditionally, WTVB follows the Coldwater Cardinals, but will occasionally air sporting events from neighboring cities and villages in the county.

=== Morning Show ===
"Delaney in the Morning", with Ken Delaney, is the station's weekday morning show, airing from 6-10AM. Previous show co-hosts have included Heather Daniels, Kevin Ireland, Jim Measel and Gary Hart. The morning show features local news and agriculture reports, horoscopes, a "birthday club" and a Wall Street stock report from various local financial institutions. WTVB is a community-oriented station, and the show also includes various live interviews from community figures.

=== Midday Journal ===
The Midday Journal is an hour-long local production, starting at 12:00 noon each weekday. The program partly consists of local news and sports, stock reports and a look in the world of agri-business news, among others.

=== Evening Journal ===
The Evening Journal, on-air from 5 to 5:30 each weekday, is designed to be programming to "send you home" after a long workday. The programming includes NASCAR Updates, a look at stocks, and a "Coaches Corner" high school sports segment (except in summer).

=== Music ===
WTVB also features the "Greatest Classic Hits of the 60s, 70s, and 80s".

Prior to adopting the current classic hits format, WTVB was an affiliate of ABC's Classic Hits (formerly Oldies Radio) format. Earlier, WTVB was an adult contemporary station with programming fed from ABC's Hits and Favorites (formerly "StarStation") network.

== Sports ==
=== NASCAR ===
WTVB carries the Performance Racing Network's "Garage Pass" program, as well as "The Final Lap" from United Stations.

=== High school sports ===
High School sports usually dominate the school year at WTVB. The station broadcasts all Coldwater Cardinal football and boys' basketball contests, home and away, as well as baseball in the spring. They also air many girls' volleyball, basketball and softball games. WTVB is considered the definitive source for Branch County high school sports.
