= WRNE =

Radio station in Gulf Breeze–Pensacola, Florida

- Gulf Breeze, Florida; United States
- Broadcast area: Pensacola area
- Frequency: 980 kHz
- Branding: "Cool 93.7 & 980"

Programming
- Format: Urban adult contemporary
- Affiliations: The Touch (Westwood One)

Ownership
- Owner: Media One Communications, Inc.

History
- First air date: 1956 (as WBOP)
- Former call signs: WBOP (1956-1985); WCHZ (1985–1986); WFXP (1986–1990)
- Call sign meaning: W Rhythm Nine Eighty

Technical information
- Licensing authority: FCC
- Facility ID: 41010
- Class: B
- Power: 4,000 watts day 1,000 watts night
- Transmitter coordinates: 30°29′0.00″N 87°5′0.00″W
- Translator: 93.7 W229CV (Pensacola)

Links
- Public license information: Public file; LMS
- Webcast: Listen Live
- Website: cool980am.com

WRNE (980 AM) is a radio station broadcasting an urban adult contemporary format. Licensed to Gulf Breeze, Florida, the station serves the Pensacola area. It is owned by Media One Communications, Inc. Its studios are in Ensley, Florida (with a Pensacola address), and its transmitter is near Avalon Beach, Florida.

The station was first licensed, as WBOP, on November 27, 1956. The station's call sign was changed to WCHZ on July 18, 1985. On July 3, 1986, the station changed its call sign to WFXP and, on December 28, 1990, to WRNE.
