= KFLQ =

Family Life Radio station in Albuquerque, New Mexico

Coordinates: 35.214°N 106.451°W

- Albuquerque, New Mexico; United States
- Broadcast area: Albuquerque metropolitan area
- Frequency: 91.5 MHz

Programming
- Format: Christian radio
- Network: Family Life Radio

Ownership
- Owner: Family Life Broadcasting Inc.; (Family Life Broadcasting System)

History
- First air date: February 2, 1976
- Former call signs: KIPC (1976–1980); KKTU (1980–1982); KNFR (1982)
- Call sign meaning: Family Life Albuquerque (Q)

Technical information
- Licensing authority: FCC
- Class: C
- ERP: 20,000 watts
- HAAT: 1,232 meters (4,042 ft)

Links
- Public license information: Public file; LMS
- Website: myflr.org

KFLQ (91.5 FM) is a non-commercial radio station licensed to Albuquerque, New Mexico, United States. It owned by the Family Life Radio Network and features contemporary Christian music with Christian talk and teaching programs.

KFLQ is a Class C station and has an effective radiated power (ERP) of 20,000 watts. The transmitter is located on Sandia Crest.

== History ==
The All-Indian Pueblo Council filed for a construction permit with the Federal Communications Commission in December 1973. It wanted to build a noncommercial radio station in Albuquerque. It later changed its name to the Albuquerque Public Broadcasting Corporation. The council said that the station would feature multicultural and multilingual programming, including some programs in native languages, Spanish-language shows and English-language programming aimed at an African American audience. One employee of the Bureau of Indian Affairs was concerned that few Native Americans had FM radios. He thought that few people in the station's target audience would be able to receive it, saying, "I don't like this business of having FM stations". In addition to the All-Indian Pueblo Council, a grant from the Department of Housing, Education and Welfare was used to start the station.

It was given the call sign KIPC and was scheduled to begin broadcasting on November 1, 1975. But there were three months of delays and it signed on the air on February 2, 1976. The station carried an eclectic mix of programs including NPR offerings, jazz music, and even Albuquerque City Council meetings. It had a morning show called "Sound of the Drum" featuring "music of all Indians".

KIPC had trouble raising the operating funds to stay on the air; by September 1977, it had gone dark while attempting to raise money. That left the University of New Mexico's KUNM-FM to emerge as the major public radio station for the city. Albuquerque Public Broadcasting Corporation entered bankruptcy that same year.

Two years later, the station was sold to Spindizzy PubCom. It became KKTU. Spindizzy had also obtained the construction permit for KQIV at 91.9 MHz in Corpus Christi, Texas. The stations in Albuquerque and Corpus Christi were sold to Family Life Radio in 1982. The price tag was $120,000. On August 6 of that year, the station changed its call sign to KNFR. It changed again to the present KFLQ on November 29, 1982. The call letters stand for Family Life Radio in AlbuQuerque.
