= WJTY =

- Lancaster, Wisconsin; United States
- Broadcast area: Southwest Wisconsin / Dubuque, Iowa
- Frequency: 88.1 MHz
- Branding: Family Life Radio

Programming
- Format: Christian contemporary music / Christian talk and teaching
- Affiliations: Family Life Radio

Ownership
- Owner: Family Life Broadcasting, Inc.

History
- First air date: March 11, 1983

Technical information
- Licensing authority: FCC
- Facility ID: 32365
- Class: C2
- ERP: 50,000 Watts
- HAAT: 145 meters (476 ft)
- Transmitter coordinates: 42°57′09″N 90°25′49″W

Links
- Public license information: Public file; LMS
- Webcast: Listen Live
- Website: myflr.org

WJTY (88.1 FM) is an owned and operated affiliate of Family Life Radio, licensed to Lancaster, Wisconsin, and serving all of Southwest Wisconsin, and parts of Northeast Iowa. The station's format consists of Christian contemporary music and Christian talk and teaching.

== History ==
The station began broadcasting March 11, 1983, airing a religious format, and was owned by Joy Public Broadcasting. In 2007, the station was sold to Family Life Communications.
