= KAKJ =

- Marianna, Arkansas; United States
- Frequency: 105.3 MHz
- Branding: Force 3

Programming
- Format: Urban adult contemporary
- Affiliations: Westwood One

Ownership
- Owner: L.T. Simes II & Raymond Simes
- Sister stations: KCLT, WNEV

Technical information
- Licensing authority: FCC
- Facility ID: 36143
- Class: A
- ERP: 6,000 watts
- HAAT: 100 meters
- Transmitter coordinates: 34°47′14″N 90°46′3″W

Links
- Public license information: Public file; LMS
- Website: force3radio.com

KAKJ (105.3 FM) is a radio station licensed to Marianna, Arkansas, United States. The station is owned by L.T. Simes II & Raymond Simes.
