= WRKR =

Coordinates: 42.129°N 85.339°W

- Portage, Michigan; United States
- Broadcast area
- Frequency: 107.7 MHz (HD Radio)
- Branding: 107.7 The Rocker

Programming
- Format: Classic rock
- Affiliations: Compass Media Networks

Ownership
- Owner: Townsquare Media; (Townsquare License, LLC)
- Sister stations: WKFR-FM, WKMI

History
- First air date: October 17, 1988
- Call sign meaning: We are The RocKeR!

Technical information
- Licensing authority: FCC
- Facility ID: 14657
- Class: B
- ERP: 50,000 watts
- HAAT: 148 meters

Links
- Public license information: Public file; LMS
- Webcast: Listen Live
- Website: wrkr.com

WRKR (107.7 FM, "The Rocker") is a radio station broadcasting a classic rock format, consisting of classic album-oriented rock tracks from the late 1960s through the early 2000s. Licensed to Portage, Michigan, it first began broadcasting in 1988.

On August 30, 2013, a deal was announced in which Townsquare Media would acquire 53 stations from Cumulus Media, including WRKR, for $238 million. The deal is part of Cumulus' acquisition of Dial Global; Townsquare and Dial Global are both controlled by Oaktree Capital Management. The sale to Townsquare was completed on November 14, 2013.
