= KUNM =

Public radio station of the University of New Mexico in Albuquerque

- Albuquerque, New Mexico; United States
- Broadcast area: Albuquerque metropolitan area
- Frequency: 89.9 MHz (HD Radio)

Programming
- Format: Variety
- Affiliations: American Public Media; National Public Radio; Pacifica Radio; Public Radio Exchange

Ownership
- Owner: University of New Mexico

History
- First air date: October 16, 1966
- Former call signs: KLNB (1966)
- Former frequencies: 90.1 MHz (1966–1987)
- Call sign meaning: University of New Mexico

Technical information
- Licensing authority: FCC
- Facility ID: 6083
- Class: C
- ERP: 21,500 watts
- HAAT: 1,252 meters (4,108 ft)
- Transmitter coordinates: 35°12′44″N 106°26′57″W
- Translators: 90.5 K213ET (Eagle Nest); 91.1 K216CU (Cuba); 91.9 K220EM (Nageezi)
- Repeaters: 88.7 KBOM (Socorro); 90.9 KRRT (Arryo Seco); 91.9 KRAR (Espanola); 91.9 KRRE (Las Vegas)

Links
- Public license information: Public file; LMS
- Webcast: Listen live
- Website: www.kunm.org

KUNM is a public radio station broadcasting on FM 89.9 MHz from high atop Sandia Crest. Its broadcasts originate from the third floor of Oñate Hall, on the campus of the University of New Mexico (UNM) on Girard Boulevard Northeast in Albuquerque, New Mexico.

As of April 3, 2008, KUNM has translators broadcasting at 90.5 in Eagle Nest-Cimarron (K213ET), 91.1 in Cuba (K216CU) and at 91.9 in Nageezi (Dzilth-Na-O-Dit) (K220EM). KUNM broadcasts in HD.

In addition, KUNM has full-power transmitters at 88.7 Socorro (KBOM), 91.9 Espanola (KRAR), and 90.9 Arroyo Seco (KRRT). Translators at 91.1 in Arroyo Seco (K216AL) and at 91.9 in Taos (K220AV) went silent with the upgrade to KRRT's transmitter status. At writing, KUNM features a range of locally produced music shows, local and national news coverage, and public affairs programming.

The call letters "KUNM" reference the University of New Mexico. The call letters "KBOM" are sardonic humour: the transmitter reaches the Trinity Nuclear Test Site. "KRAR" stands for "Rio Arriba Radio", since Espanola is located in Rio Arriba County. KRRT stands for "Radio Relay Taos".

The station is funded through a combination of listener sponsorship, underwriting by local businesses and support from nonprofits, student fees, and various other sources. Listener support accounts for a little over 50% of the station's total annual operating budget.

== History ==
KUNM began life April 30, 1960, as KNMD, a carrier current AM radio station on the University of New Mexico (UNM) campus broadcast through power lines in campus buildings. However, by 1964, fraternity and sorority members, as well as other students living off campus, complained that their student fees were being used to pay for a service they could not receive. That year, the Radio Board decided the best solution was to obtain a Federal Communications Commission (FCC) educational broadcast license for a transmitter on Sandia Crest, where television station KNME-TV, partially owned by UNM, was already broadcasting. The board ultimately decided in 1965 to broadcast from a transmitter on top of the Student Union Building, with Sandia Crest planned as an expansion later.

The Board of Regents made the application in March 1966 for a construction permit for 90.1 MHz, which the Federal Communications Commission (FCC) granted on July 18. The station desired the call letters KUNM but ran into an objection from another Albuquerque radio station: KBNM, which had adopted those call letters on March 18, 1966. As a result, on October 19, 1966, the station went on the air, broadcasting with 3,700 watts of effective radiated power and the provisional call letters KLNB. The station was able to claim the KUNM call letters two days later.

KUNM originally broadcast primarily classical and jazz music, but by 1969 its emphasis had shifted to "underground" rock music in a free-form radio style.

In 1974, KUNM filed to move its transmitter to Sandia Crest. Hubbard Broadcasting, owner of KOB-AM-TV, filed a petition to deny to the application, but the application was conditionally approved in 1975. KUNM moved its studios from the Student Union Building to Oñate Hall in 1976, simultaneous with the activation of the Sandia Crest facility.

KUNM became a member of NPR in 1978, following the bankruptcy and closure of KIPC the year before. NPR membership required additional staffing, and federal legal changes also led to the establishment of a community advisory board. Funding for this transition was accomplished through benefit concerts at the Kiva Auditorium in downtown Albuquerque. The station's first national broadcast contribution was an exclusive interview with Manuel Noriega by a KUNM news reporter.

The frequency change to 89.9 MHz was carried out in 1987; this permitted KSFR (90.7 FM) to be built by Santa Fe Community College in Santa Fe. The community college paid for the costs of the adjustment.

Coinciding with the new frequency was a format adjustment as KUNM abandoned free-form rock in favor of new talk and classical music programs, citing declining listenership and a poor rate of membership renewals; KUNM members had a renewal rate of 25 percent compared with 72 percent nationally. The move was also intended to reestablish the weakening connection between KUNM and the University of New Mexico itself. However, many of the station's 100 volunteer staffers objected to the change, voicing concerns on the air in violation of station policy. One volunteer wrote a rap, "The Free-form Shuffle", in protest. The dispute escalated to a temporary restraining order on spending listener contributions, threats of charges against the program director, and lockouts of employees by campus police. While management relented and reversed course, questions remained about whether KUNM's primary audience should be students or the broader community.

In 2014, an ombudsman with the Corporation for Public Broadcasting criticized KUNM's handling of plagiarism charges made by a former reporter, Tristan Ahtone, who left the station over its alleged failure to respond to the accusations.

== Programming ==
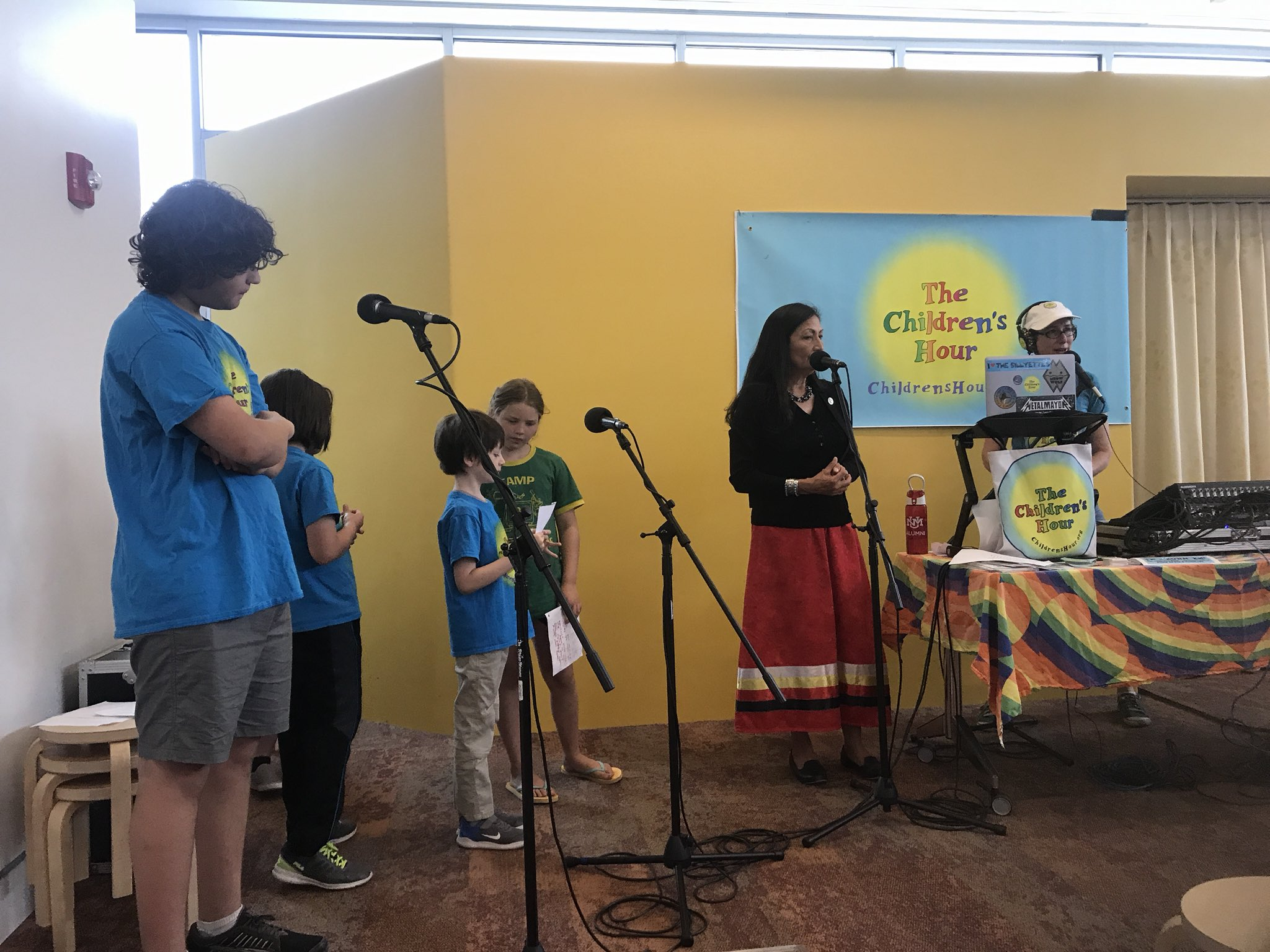
Deb Haaland appearing on "The Children's Hour" on KUNM in 2019.

In addition to such NPR national programs as All Things Considered and Morning Edition, the weekday KUNM lineup includes Performance Today and blocks of jazz and freeform rock music. Democracy Now! from Pacifica Radio airs in early afternoons. At night and on weekends, specialty local and national programs are heard.

Five times a week, KUNM airs the live call-in show Native America Calling, which focuses on Native American issues. The program debuted in 1995 with KUNM providing production services.

== Signal expansions ==
In 2008, KUNM launched three high-power repeaters. KBOM in Socorro signed on February 15, 2008, broadcasting from "Mountain M" at 88.7 MHz. KRAR in Española followed on April 1, 2008, with 6,000 watts from Black Mesa on 91.9 MHz. Two days later, the new Arroyo Seco station, KRRT 90.9 MHz, came into service. The new stations replaced translators at 91.1 in Taos (K220AV) and 91.9 in Arroyo Seco (K216AL).

== See also ==
- List of community radio stations in the United States
