= Family Life Radio =

American network of Christian radio stations

- Type: Radio network
- Country: United States
- Headquarters: Tucson, Arizona

Ownership
- Owner: Intentional Life Media

History
- Launch date: 1966

Links
- Webcast: Listen Live
- Website: www.myflr.org

Family Life Radio (rebranded as Intentional Life Media) is a network of Christian radio stations in the United States, broadcasting Contemporary Christian music, as well as Christian talk and teaching programs. The network is based in Tucson, Arizona, with its flagship station as KFLT-FM at 104.1 MHz.

Previous logo

Christian talk and teaching shows heard on Family Life Radio include Intentional Living with Dr. Randy Carlson. In 2024, in an effort to reduce confusion with the New York and Pennsylvania-based Family Life Network, Family Life Communications announced its rebrand as Intentional Life Media. The radio network continues to use the "Family Life Radio" name.

Intentional Life Media is rated as a four-star charity by Charity Navigator. It is also certified by the Evangelical Council for Financial Accountability.

== History ==
Warren Bolthouse first launched Family Life Radio in his basement studio with a 30-minute program. In 1966, Family Life Radio's first station aired in Mason, Michigan.

In 2024, Family Life Communications rebranded as Intentional Life Media to grow "beyond radio to offer a richer and more diverse experience through digital content, music streaming, live events, community service, and more.” The company operates its Family Life Radio network across 11 states.

In February 2026, Best Christian Workplaces recognized Intentional Life Media.

== Leadership ==
Evan Carlson is Intentional Life Media's president and CEO. He previously served as the ministry's executive vice president before succeeding his father, Dr. Randy Carlson.

== Brands ==
As of 2026, Intentional Life Media's brands include Family Life Radio, International Life Events, and Intentional Living.

Family Life Radio hosts community service initiatives. In June 2026, it partnered on the Midland Community Shoe Drive, giving away donated shoes and socks to local children in Lubbock, Texas.

Intentional Living, a radio program hosted by Dr. Randy Carlson, discusses family, marriage, and financial issues with callers around the country. Carlson encourages listeners to tackle "One Thing" at a time. He also produces podcasts and one-minute Intentional Living videos and shorts.

== Stations ==
Family Life Radio is currently heard on 36 radio stations in Arizona, California, Colorado, Florida, Georgia, Kansas, Michigan, New Mexico, Tennessee, Texas, and Wisconsin.

Call sign	Frequency	City of license	State	Power (W)	ERP (W)	FCC info
KJTA	89.9 FM	Flagstaff	Arizona	—	1,000	FCC (KJTA)
KFLR-FM	90.3 FM	Phoenix	Arizona	—	100,000	FCC (KFLR-FM)
KFLT-FM	104.1 FM	Tucson	Arizona	—	3,000	FCC (KFLT-FM)
KLFF	89.3 FM	San Luis Obispo	California	—	4,400	FCC (KLFF)
KGDP-FM	90.5 FM	Santa Maria	California	—	17,500	FCC (KGDP-FM)
WJTF	89.9 FM	Panama City	Florida	—	100,000	FCC (WJTF)
WJTG	91.3 FM	Macon	Georgia	—	100,000	FCC (WJTG)
KJTY	88.1 FM	Topeka	Kansas	—	75,000	FCC (KJTY)
WUFN	96.7 FM	Albion	Michigan	—	3,200	FCC (WUFN)
WBFN	1400 AM	Battle Creek	Michigan	1,000	—	FCC (WBFN)
WUFL	93.1 FM	Detroit	Michigan	—	26,500	
WUNN	1110 AM	Mason	Michigan	1,000 day	—	FCC (WUNN)
WUGN	99.7 FM	Midland	Michigan	—	100,000	FCC (WUGN)
KFLQ	91.5 FM	Albuquerque	New Mexico	—	20,000	FCC (KFLQ)
KWFL	99.3 FM	Roswell	New Mexico	—	16,500	FCC (KWFL)
WJBP	91.5 FM	Chattanooga	Tennessee	—	11,000 H 10,000 V	FCC (WJBP)
KAMY	90.1 FM	Lubbock	Texas	—	63,000	FCC (KAMY)
KFLB-FM	88.1 FM	Midland	Texas	—	100,000	FCC (KFLB-FM)
WJTY	88.1 FM	Lancaster	Wisconsin	—	7,000 H 49,000 V	FCC (WJTY)

Broadcast translators of Family Life Radio
Call sign	Frequency (MHz)	City of license	State	ERP (W)	FCC info
K294AN	106.7	Payson	Arizona	12	FCC (K294AN)
K208EG	89.5	Alamosa	Colorado	170	FCC (K208EG)
K217EG	91.3	Lamar	Colorado	100	FCC (K217EG)
K209BC	89.7	San Antonio	Colorado	48	FCC (K209BC)
W266CG	101.1	Battle Creek	Michigan	230	FCC (W266CG)
W260BX	99.9	Lansing	Michigan	190	FCC (W260BX)
K212BB	90.3	Alamogordo	New Mexico	11	FCC (K212BB)
K209EG	89.7	Artesia	New Mexico	25	FCC (K209EG)
K215EK	90.9	Carlsbad	New Mexico	92	FCC (K215EK)
K205EX	88.9	Clovis	New Mexico	60	FCC (K205EX)
K208ED	89.5	Deming	New Mexico	50	FCC (K208ED)
K204GJ	88.7	Las Vegas	New Mexico	250	FCC (K204GJ)
K264BA	100.7	Portales	New Mexico	250	FCC (K264BA)
K297AE	107.3	Ruidoso	New Mexico	9	FCC (K297AE)
K211DW	90.1	Tucumcari	New Mexico	28	FCC (K211DW)
K298BN	107.5	Big Spring	Texas	115	FCC (K298BN)
K269FG	101.7	Odessa	Texas	250	FCC (K269FG)
