= KWFL =

Roswell, New Mexico; United States
- Frequency: 99.3 MHz
- Branding: Family Life Radio

Programming
- Format: Contemporary Inspirational
- Affiliations: Family Life Radio

Ownership
- Owner: Family Life Broadcasting System

Technical information
- Licensing authority: FCC
- Facility ID: 57715
- Class: C2
- ERP: 16,500 watts
- HAAT: 133.0 meters (436.4 ft)
- Transmitter coordinates: 33°21′47″N 104°38′11″W

Links
- Public license information: Public file; LMS
- Website: Official website

KWFL (99.3 FM, Family Life Radio) is a radio station broadcasting a Contemporary Inspirational music format. Licensed to Roswell, New Mexico, United States. The station is currently owned by Family Life Broadcasting System.
