= John Fetzer =

American radio executive (1901–1991)

- Born: John Earl Fetzer; March 25, 1901
- Died: February 20, 1991 (aged 89); Honolulu, Hawaii, U.S.
- Occupations: Radio and television executive
- Known for: Owner of the Detroit Tigers

John Earl Fetzer (March 25, 1901 – February 20, 1991) was an American radio and television executive who was best known as the part-owner of the Detroit Tigers from 1956 to 1961 and sole owner from 1961 through 1983. Under his ownership, the 1968 Tigers won the World Series.

== Biography ==
Born in 1901, Fetzer moved with his mother to Lafayette, Indiana, after his father died when Fetzer was 2 years old. There, his brother-in-law, a telegraph operator for the Wabash Railroad, introduced young John to the early workings of wireless communication. Via telegraph reports, they would track the baseball games of the Detroit Tigers, which he would later own.

Radio was still in its infancy, but Fetzer took it seriously and built his first transmitter-receiver in 1917 and began communicating from his home in Indiana with a man in Pittsburgh, Pennsylvania. In 1922, he came to Michigan and enrolled at Emmanuel Missionary College, now known as Andrews University, in Berrien Springs, and began operating an experimental radio station for the school. The station became so popular that in 1923, it sought and received a full license under the calls KFGZ, operating it as a noncommercial full-service station for the St. Joseph Valley. The calls became WEMC in 1925. While at EMC, he met Rhea Yeager. They would stay married until his death, 65 years later.

Fetzer toured Europe in the late 1920s, studying radio operations, and recalled being repulsed by government monopolies on radio there. He returned to the United States at the beginnings of the Great Depression and would remain a staunch advocate of a "hands off" policy by the government in the communications industry.

By then, despite WEMC's popularity, Emmanuel Missionary College was running out of money to operate its radio station. Unwilling to either operate commercially or solicit donations from listeners, college officials offered to sell it to Fetzer. He bought it for $2,500. As in his student days, he ran the station's operations himself, serving as technician, engineer, announcer and salesman. In 1931, he moved the station to Kalamazoo because of his wife's area ties. Kalamazoo was also the last major city in Michigan without its own radio station. Later that year, the station signed on under new calls, WKZO, from studios in the Burdick Hotel. Mr. and Mrs. Fetzer worked side by side. She served as program director and secretary. He sold advertising and kept track of the technology. He said of these early beginnings, "It was a mixture of pride, stubbornness and stupidity that kept me in the business. If I knew then what I know now about economics, I would have shut down."

His innovations in radio led to the development of a directional antenna for broadcasting at night. This, in turn, led to a lawsuit by WOW in Omaha, Nebraska, which claimed the directional antenna would interfere with its signal if allowed. The case went through the Supreme Court twice and was finally settled in Fetzer's favor on the floor of the United States Senate. This led to some 3,000 stations getting their licenses granted by the FCC and put Fetzer in the position of pioneer and confidante of many in Washington.

During World War II, he was appointed the national radio censor for the U.S. Office of Censorship and created voluntary censorship of more than 900 radio stations so that they would not broadcast information that would be beneficial to the enemy. When the war started to wind down, Fetzer began asking for smaller and smaller budgets to run the office and began firing the 15,000 people employed by the office. When the war ended, he closed up shop and stored all the information in the basement of the National Archives. He said, "I'm convinced if we hadn't, the Office of Censorship would still be with us today, and I shudder to think how powerful it might be."

Fetzer's own broadcasting empire grew during the war and spread from Kalamazoo to Grand Rapids, Nebraska and Peoria. He formed the Fetzer Music Corporation and acquired the Muzak franchise for out-state Michigan in 1958. Inevitably, he would get into the new medium, television, and established Fetzer Cablevision, eventually, in Kalamazoo. That has since become Charter Communications providing cable television service to the Kalamazoo area.

Fetzer purchased KOLN-AM-TV in Lincoln, Nebraska in 1953, and did something unique for a broadcaster at the time. By erecting a 1,000-foot tower for the television station outside of town and pushing the powerful signal to the west, rather than to the more populated and established TV market in Omaha (as well as purchasing a rival station and donating its license to the local university for an educational station), KOLN-TV created a near monopoly on a rural area previously ignored by broadcasters. He later established KGIN in Grand Island as a satellite of KOLN, further expanding both the coverage area and the profitability. According to Steve Smethers, professor of journalism and mass communications at Kansas State University, "The old 10/11 strong model is just an incredible idea in terms of serving a very rural part of the state." Longtime KOLN/KGIN television personality Leta Powell Drake noted that "KOLN used to have in their news an 85 share of the audience. That means for all the sets that are tuned into television, 85 percent of the viewers were watching 10/11 News."

In 1956 he bought part ownership in the Tigers and became full owner in 1961. He was active in negotiating broadcast packages for Major League Baseball. For the most part, Fetzer preferred to stay in the background. He mostly left the Tigers in the hands of general manager Jim Campbell, though he nominally remained team president until handing the title to Campbell in 1978.

For residents of the northern Lower Peninsula and eastern Upper Peninsula, Fetzer's name was synonymous between 1958 and 1978 with ownership of WWTV in Cadillac and its satellite in Sault Sainte Marie, WWUP, as well as ownership of the Tigers.

In the early 1980s he began to divest himself of his business holdings and sold the Tigers to Domino's Pizza founder and owner Tom Monaghan after the 1983 season (the Tigers would win the World Series the following year). Monaghan himself followed Fetzer's footsteps into broadcasting and now holds a significant stake in a number of broadcast properties airing mostly religious programming, through entities owned or controlled. Much of Fetzer's wealth was used to fund the Fetzer Institute.

Fetzer died in 1991 in a hospital in Honolulu, Hawaii, where he was being treated for pneumonia.

== Former Fetzer-owned broadcast properties ==
Radio:

- WWAM/WKJF (now WLJW) and WWTV-FM/WKJF-FM (now WJZQ), Cadillac, Michigan
- WJEF (now WTKG), Grand Rapids, Michigan
- WJFM (now WBCT), Grand Rapids, Michigan
- WKZO, Kalamazoo, Michigan
- KOLN (now KLIN), Lincoln, Nebraska

Television:

- WWTV, Cadillac, Michigan; and satellite station WWUP, Sault Ste Marie, Michigan
- WKZO-TV (now WWMT), Kalamazoo, Michigan
- KMEG-TV, Sioux City, Iowa
- KOLN-TV, Lincoln, Nebraska; and satellite station KGIN-TV, Grand Island, Nebraska
