= KLFF (FM) =

Coordinates: 35.360°N 120.656°W

- San Luis Obispo, California; United States
- Broadcast area: San Luis Obispo, California
- Frequency: 89.3 MHz
- Branding: Family Life Radio 89.3

Programming
- Format: Christian radio

Ownership
- Owner: Family Life Communications; (Family Life Broadcasting, Inc.)

History
- First air date: September 3, 1995
- Former call signs: KWCP (1993–1994); KLFF (1994–2001); KLFF-FM (2001–2013)
- Call sign meaning: K-LiF(F)e

Technical information
- Licensing authority: FCC
- Class: B
- ERP: 4,400 watts
- HAAT: 466 meters (1,529 ft)

Links
- Public license information: Public file; LMS
- Webcast: Listen Live
- Website: myflr.org

KLFF (89.3 FM, "Family Life Radio 89.3") is a non-commercial radio station that is licensed to and serves San Luis Obispo, California. The station is owned by Family Life Broadcasting and broadcasts the contemporary Christian music format of the nationally syndicated Family Life Radio network.

== History ==
KLFF was first signed on September 3, 1995 by Logos Broadcasting Corporation. From the beginning, KLFF aired a contemporary Christian music format branded as "K-Life".

In January 2015, KLFF was rebranded from "K-Life" to "Life 89.3".

In May 2016, Logos Broadcasting sold KLFF to Family Life Broadcasting for $400,000. On August 20, the new owner flipped the station to its Family Life Radio network, originating from KFLT-FM in Tucson, Arizona.

== KLFH ==
KLFF was formerly rebroadcast on repeater KLFH in Ojai, California on 89.5 FM, covering the Oxnard—Ventura area. In early 2014, KLFH was sold to Southern California Public Radio, the organization that operates KPCC in Pasadena.
