= WJBP =

Family Life Radio station in Red Bank–Chattanooga, Tennessee

Coordinates: 34.944°N 85.300°W

Red Bank, Tennessee; United States
- Broadcast area: Chattanooga
- Frequency: 91.5 MHz
- Branding: Family Life Radio

Programming
- Format: Christian
- Network: Family Life Radio

Ownership
- Owner: Family Life Broadcasting Inc.

History
- First air date: September 1980 (as WCSO)
- Former call signs: WCSO (1980–1987); WAWL-FM (1987–2008)

Technical information
- Licensing authority: FCC
- Facility ID: 10670
- Class: C3
- ERP: 11,000 watts
- HAAT: 100 meters (330 ft)

Links
- Public license information: Public file; LMS
- Website: myflr.org

WJBP (91.5 FM) is a non-commercial Christian radio station located in Red Bank, Tennessee, owned by the Family Life Radio network. The transmitter is located in Fairview, Georgia.

== History ==
On March 6, 1978, Chattanooga State Technical Community College applied for a construction permit to build a new radio station on 91.5 FM at Signal Mountain, Tennessee, broadcasting with 137 watts. The Federal Communications Commission approved the permit on March 13, 1979, and WCSO began broadcasting in September 1980.

WCSO was a typical college radio station; it did not begin broadcasting overnights until 1985, when it started airing a tape loop of nature sounds at night. The off-hours programming developed a cult following with listeners, including a prison inmate who wrote to the station to say that the programming had helped him not go crazy. The call letters were changed from WCSO to WAWL-FM on December 18, 1987, which marked the shift from a soft adult contemporary format to an alternative rock base; the station was known as "the WAWL".

In March 2008, Chattanooga State announced it was selling the WAWL-FM license, with the school's programming moving online-only. In September 2008, the buyer was identified as Family Life Radio, paying $1.5 million. On December 10, 2008, WAWL-FM ended operations. The station was then silent until Family Life Radio reactivated the facility as WJBP with its national programming on January 2, 2009.
