= WUGN =

Family Life Radio station in Midland, Michigan

- Midland, Michigan; United States
- Broadcast area: Saginaw-Bay City-Midland
- Frequency: 99.7 MHz
- Branding: Family Life Radio

Programming
- Format: Adult Contemporary Christian
- Affiliations: Family Life Radio

Ownership
- Owner: Family Life Communications; (Family Life Broadcasting System)

History
- First air date: September 29, 1961
- Former call signs: WQDC (1961–1970); WSVC (1970–1973)

Technical information
- Licensing authority: FCC
- Facility ID: 20639
- Class: C
- Power: 100,000 watts
- HAAT: 304 meters
- Transmitter coordinates: 43°30′56″N 84°32′49″W

Links
- Public license information: Public file; LMS
- Website: myflr.org

WUGN (99.7 FM) is a non-commercial Christian radio station in Midland, Michigan. The station broadcasts with 100,000 watts from a 997-foot tower, giving it a strong signal throughout the middle of the mitten of Michigan from Houghton Lake southward to Lansing and Flint. Under the right conditions, the station can be heard south to Ann Arbor and almost as far south as the Ohio and Indiana state lines, in most of the Grand Rapids metropolitan area, northward into Michigan's Upper Peninsula, and even as far away as Port Clinton, Ohio.

The station began broadcasting under its current ownership in 1973 as the third station owned and operated by Family Life Communications (commonly referred to as FLR or Family Life Radio). WUGN plays a contemporary mix of Christian music. WUGN's local morning show is Peter Brooks and the Morning team, a family-friendly breakfast program.

In 1999, WUGN won the Marconi Christian station of the year.

The 99.7 frequency previously broadcast from 1961 to 1970 as WQDC, which was Midland's first FM station. WQDC's studios were on Main Street in downtown Midland. In 1970, WQDC was sold to Saginaw Valley State University (then known as Saginaw Valley College), who gave the station the calls WSVC and changed the station's city of license to Auburn. In late 1972, SVC sold the station to Family Life Radio, who took over operations in 1973 after changing the city of license back to Midland and relocating the transmitter to its current site near Shepherd. WUGN operates on the original WQDC license to this day.

Former logo
