= WQXC-FM =

Coordinates: 42.5072°N 85.7589°W

Simulcast with WFAT Battle Creek
- Allegan, Michigan; United States
- Broadcast area
- Frequency: 100.9 MHz
- Branding: Cool FM

Programming
- Format: Oldies

Ownership
- Owner: Midwest Communications; (Midwest Communications, Inc.)

History
- First air date: 1981 (as WAOP)
- Former call signs: WAOP (4/5/81-3/15/85)

Technical information
- Licensing authority: FCC
- Facility ID: 22128
- Class: A
- ERP: 3,000 watts
- HAAT: 100 meters

Links
- Public license information: Public file; LMS
- Webcast: Listen Live
- Website: wqxc.com

WQXC-FM (100.9 MHz, "Cool FM") is a radio station broadcasting an oldies format. Licensed to Allegan, Michigan, it first began broadcasting in 1981 under the WAOP call sign.

Previous logo

WQXC-FM was licensed to Otsego, Michigan from its sign-on until the city of license changed to Allegan in November 2006. Prior to adopting the current Oldies format aimed at the Kalamazoo market, the station had programmed Adult Contemporary music focused toward the Otsego/Allegan area. The station was also formerly known by the name "Quixie 101" (with "Quixie" being a sounding-out of the station's calls) prior to changing to "Cool 101".

On February 6, 2025, WQXC-FM began simulcasting on WFAT 930 AM Battle Creek and rebranded as "Cool FM".

== Bronco Radio Network ==
For three seasons starting in the fall of 2007, WQXC was the flagship station of the Western Michigan University "Broncos Radio Network" for hockey and women's basketball.

== See also ==
- WAKV 980 AM, WQXC's former sister station
