= WAWL-LP =

- Grand Haven, Michigan; United States
- Broadcast area: Tri-Cities
- Frequency: 103.5 MHz
- Branding: Community Broadcasting for the Tri-Cities

Programming
- Format: Classic Rock, Local News & Sports

Ownership
- Owner: Tri-Cities Broadcasting Foundation, Inc.

Technical information
- Licensing authority: FCC
- Facility ID: 196109
- Class: LP1
- ERP: 100 watts
- HAAT: 24 metres (79 ft)
- Transmitter coordinates: 43°04′01.1″N 86°12′54.2″W

Links
- Public license information: LMS
- Webcast: Listen live
- Website: 1035wawl.com

WAWL-LP (103.5 FM) is a community radio station licensed to serve Grand Haven, Michigan. The station airs a classic rock format, as well as local news and sports.

Owned by Tri-Cities Broadcasting Foundation, Inc., a non-profit organization, WAWL-LP focuses on assisting young people in pursuing careers in broadcasting. The foundation operates the station in cooperation with public educational institutions in the Grand Haven area.

== History ==
WAWL-LP was assigned its call letters by the Federal Communications Commission on January 29, 2014. The station, which began broadcasting in July 2014, was launched by Eric Kaelin, a former general manager of Grand Haven classic hits station WGHN-AM.

In forming the Tri-Cities Broadcasting Foundation, Kaelin brought together officials from Grand Haven High School, Muskegon Community College, and Grand Valley State University. The foundation's mission is to teach broadcasting skills to students, including marketing and financial aspects of the radio industry.

WAWL-LP has not had any connection with Tennessee's Chattanooga State Community College's WAWL 91.5 FM which broadcast on air from 1980 to 2013 and continues to broadcast on the web at WAWL.org. "College Radio at its Best."
