= WVFM =

- Kalamazoo, Michigan; United States
- Broadcast area: Kalamazoo-Battle Creek
- Frequency: 106.5 MHz
- Branding: 106.5 Jack FM

Programming
- Format: Adult hits
- Affiliations: Jack FM network

Ownership
- Owner: Midwest Communications; (Midwest Communications, Inc.)
- Sister stations: WKZO, WTOU, WNWN, WZOX, WFAT

History
- First air date: June 19, 1964
- Former call signs: WKMI-FM (1964–1966); WSEO (1966–1972); WQLR (1972–2007)

Technical information
- Licensing authority: FCC
- Facility ID: 20453
- Class: B
- ERP: 33,000 watts
- HAAT: 183 meters (600 ft)
- Transmitter coordinates: 42.476°N 85.485°W

Links
- Public license information: Public file; LMS
- Webcast: Listen live
- Website: jack1065.com

WVFM (106.5 FM) is an adult hits radio station serving the Kalamazoo, Michigan radio market. The station has an ERP of 33 kW. They are owned by Midwest Communications. WVFM 106.5 is located on a crowded frequency across southwest lower Michigan. The station covers all of Kalamazoo/Battle Creek area, can be heard well in the Grand Rapids area, and reaches as far north and east as Lansing and Jackson. During summer months, the station can be received to Flint and Ann Arbor on occasion.

The station previously competed with Grand Rapids' iHeartMedia-owned WSRW-FM (Star 105.7), a more traditional pop-based AC station whose 265,000-watt signal easily reaches Kalamazoo. WVFM was Kalamazoo's home of the John Tesh Radio Show, competing with Delilah on Star 105.7.

== History timeline ==
- June 1964: Steere Broadcasting launched WKMI-FM with 23,500 watts of power on 106.5 FM, as an FM stereo companion to contemporary-music formatted WKMI 1360 AM. It was Kalamazoo's first commercial FM station. According to a Billboard magazine article, the station broadcast from 6 a.m. to midnight and aired an MOR music format incorporating selections from current stereo pop albums, Broadway show tunes, and some light classics.
- April 1966: Steere Broadcasting changed WKMI-FM's call letters to WSEO, retaining the easy-listening/MOR music format. Station brass explained that since WKMI-FM had become a popular station in its fewer than two years on the air, the change was made to help the station continue to develop its own identity.
- June 1972: WSEO was purchased by Fairfield Broadcasting, separating the station from WKMI. Call letters changed to WQLR ("Clear") and the station settled into a homegrown Beautiful music format which would continue for the next two decades. In the mid-1970s, the station's owners started a beautiful music syndication service called KalaMusic after WOMC in Detroit copied WQLR's formatics and became a ratings success (1).
- Early 1990s: WQLR shifted from beautiful music to adult contemporary under the name "Q-Lite 106.5."
- March 1999: WQLR dropped its longtime "Q-Lite 106.5" name to become simply "Q106.5."
- April 2002-March 2003: "Q106.5" tweaked its AC format to more of a Hot AC approach, adding music by alternative rock artists such as Nickelback and Puddle of Mudd.
- January 2006: Midwest Communications announced that it would purchase WQLR and its sister stations, WKZO 590 AM and WQSN 1660 AM, from Fairfield Broadcasting for $13.25 million, pending FCC approval and closing. Not included in the same was WKLZ 1470 AM which was subsequently taken off the air. The sale was approved in March 2006.
- August 27, 2006: WQLR moves from AC to Variety hits as "106-5 The Q", using Midwest's Guaranteed Music Variety format already in use at several of the company's other FM stations.
- March 26, 2007: The WQLR callsign is moved to another Midwest Communications station as part of a drive to help listeners remember the WVFM callsigns for Arbitron listener logs.
- 2009: The station shifts to a classic hits-based adult contemporary format. Through all the changes, the station has remained highly rated in the Kalamazoo market.
- February 24, 2021: The station changes its format from adult contemporary to adult hits, branded as "106.5 Jack FM", picking up the format from WZOX 96.5 FM Portage, which launched a Top 40 format on March 3, 2021.
- February 28, 2025: The station tweaks its format more towards Alternative rock and Modern AC, adding classic alternative rock from the 1980s through the 2000s and some current music as well. Many of the traditional classic rock and top 40 components of a typical JACK playlist have been reduced.
- August 2025: By this time, the station has completed further tweaks, including adding more recent Modern AC tracks as well as adding some familiar pop tunes from the 80s and 90s. Virtually all guitar-based songs from the 1960s through the 1980s have been scrubbed from the playlist. Overall, the playlist skewed younger and more female-friendly compared to the presentation from several years ago.
- March 2026: The station begun to present more as a traditional Jack format again, playing a balance of pop, rock, alternative, and new wave, focusing largely on the 1980s through more recent releases.
