= WBFN =

Coordinates: 42°18′15″N 85°11′31″W

- Battle Creek, Michigan; United States
- Broadcast area: Radio-Locator: WBFN
- Frequency: 1400 kHz
- Branding: Family Life Radio

Programming
- Format: Religious
- Affiliations: Family Life Radio

Ownership
- Owner: Family Life Broadcasting; (Family Life Broadcasting System)

History
- First air date: September 28, 1926
- Former call signs: WKBP (1926–1930); WELL (1930–1964); WKFR (1964–1972); WKNR (1972–1988); WELL (1988–1996); WWKN (1996–1997); WRCC (1997–2006)
- Call sign meaning: Battle Creek's The Fan (former branding)

Technical information
- Licensing authority: FCC
- Facility ID: 37462
- Class: C
- Power: 1,000 watts
- Translator: 101.1 W266CG (Battle Creek)

Links
- Public license information: Public file; LMS
- Website: Family Life Radio

WBFN (1400 AM) is a radio station licensed to Battle Creek, Michigan, that broadcasts an adult contemporary Christian music and religious teaching format as an affiliate of Family Life Radio. The station operates full time with a power of 1,000 watts.

WBFN is one of Michigan's oldest radio stations, having first signed on, as WKBP, in the fall of 1926. In addition, the station's original owner, the Battle Creek Enquirer and News, had operated a temporary station, WJBM, in October 1925, which is sometimes included as part of the station's history.

== History ==
In October 1925, the Battle Creek Enquirer and News received a temporary permit for a station with the sequentially assigned call letters of WJBM. This station was operated by the newspaper in conjunction with a local radio equipment sales show. It conducted a test program on the 15th, followed by a formal broadcast on October 19. WJBM ceased operations with the close of the events.

On September 18, 1926, the newspaper received a permanent radio station license for WKBP, initially with 50 watts at 1130 kilohertz. These call letters were sequentially assigned, and the newspaper held a contest for listeners to suggest a slogan that reflected the call sign. The winning entry, from more than 2,000 submissions, was "We Keep Breakfast Popular", submitted by station technician W. S. Martin. The station signed on the air for the first time on September 28, 1926.

On November 11, 1928, under the provisions of the Federal Radio Commission's "General Order 40", WKBP was assigned to 1420 kHz. On March 12, 1930, the station changed its call letters to WELL. (Local resident John Harvey Kellogg was famous at this time for promoting "the road to wellness" at his sanitarium) In March 1941, the implementation of the North American Regional Broadcasting Agreement resulted in nearly all the stations on 1420 kHz being moved to 1450. However, WELL was an exception, and instead shifted to 1400, where the station has remained ever since. An FM sister, WELL-FM (now WKFR-FM), was added in June 1963, originally at 96.5 mHz but soon moving to 103.3.

On November 13, 1964, WELL changed its call letters to WKFR and switched its format from "Middle of the Road" (MOR) musical fare to Top 40 as "Keener 14," inspired by the success of WKNR "Keener 13" in Detroit (now WDTW). After the Detroit station dropped the WKNR calls as part of a sale and format change, on August 30, 1972, WKFR became WKNR. (However, its sister FM station did not change its calls, and remained WKFR-FM). The Top 40 format at AM 1400 continued until about 1982, when it was transferred to WKFR-FM (which retains it to this day). During the 1980s WKNR featured an oldies format and also a simulcast of WKFR-FM's Contemporary Hit Radio (CHR) format, before returning to the heritage WELL calls in on August 1, 1988.

On March 18, 1996, the call letters were briefly changed to WWKN, again standing for "keener". On January 10, 1997, it became WRCC, standing for "Radio Cereal City".

On July 27, 2006, the current call letters, WBFN, were adopted, as part of a switch to an all-sports schedule as "The Fan". The station previously carried the Music of Your Life adult standards format and was known as "Unforgettable 1400."

In early 2007 Clear Channel Communications agreed to transfer WBFN plus seven other local radio stations to Cumulus Broadcasting as part of Clear Channel's private equity takeover. Cumulus in turn agreed to immediately donate WBFN to Family Life Communications, in order to conform with the Federal Communications Commission's (FCC) market current ownership limits. In September WBFN began simulcasting Family Life's 96.7 FM WUFN in Albion, and the FCC approved the license transfer to Family Life on December 20, 2007, however the actual transfer was still contingent on the private equity takeover of Clear Channel, reportedly delayed because the credit crunch was making it difficult for the private equity firms to raise the necessary funds. The deal was ultimately completed on February 18, 2011.

WBFN signed on a 230-watt FM translator, W266CG 101.1 FM in Battle Creek, in September 2014.

== Award ==
WELL received a 1946 Peabody Award for Outstanding Public Community Service for its program, "Our Town."
