= WKZO (AM) =

- Kalamazoo, Michigan; United States
- Broadcast area: Kalamazoo–Portage metropolitan area; Southwest Michigan
- Frequency: 590 kHz
- Branding: Newsradio 590 and 106.9 FM WKZO

Programming
- Format: Talk
- Affiliations: Fox News Radio; Compass Media Networks; Premiere Networks; Westwood One; Detroit Lions; Detroit Red Wings; Detroit Tigers; Kalamazoo Wings

Ownership
- Owner: Midwest Communications; (Midwest Communications, Inc.)
- Sister stations: WFAT; WNWN; WQXC; WTOU; WVFM; WZOX; WZUU

History
- First air date: April 28, 1923 (in Berrien Springs, moved to Kalamazoo in 1931)
- Former call signs: KFGZ (1923–1925); WEMC (1925–1930)
- Call sign meaning: "Kalamazoo"

Technical information
- Licensing authority: FCC
- Facility ID: 54485
- Class: B
- Power: 5,000 watts
- Transmitter coordinates: 42°20′55.1″N 85°33′48″W
- Translator: 106.9 W295CL (Kalamazoo)
- Repeater: 930 WFAT (Battle Creek)

Links
- Public license information: Public file; LMS
- Webcast: Listen Live
- Website: www.wkzo.com

WKZO (590 kHz) is a commercial AM radio station in Kalamazoo, Michigan. It is owned by Midwest Communications, Inc., and airs a talk radio format. The studios and offices are on West Main Street in Kalamazoo.

WKZO's transmitter is a four-tower array on McKinley Street at 21st Street North in Cooper Township, Michigan. The station operates at 5,000 watts, using a non-directional antenna by day. Due to its location near the bottom of the AM dial, as well as its transmitter power and West Michigan's mostly flat land (with near-perfect ground conductivity), its daytime signal reaches much of the southwestern Lower Peninsula, with Grade B coverage as far east as Lansing, as far south as South Bend and as far north as Mount Pleasant. At night, to protect other stations on AM 590, WKZO switches to a directional antenna, with power fed to all four towers. Much of the nighttime signal is directed north, concentrating it in the Kalamazoo and Grand Rapids areas. WKZO programming is also on a 200-watt FM translator, 106.9 W295CL, heard in Kalamazoo and adjacent communities.

== Programming ==
Since late December 2021, weekday mornings have begun with an hour of America in The Morning, followed by a four-hour morning show hosted by Ken Lanphear. Late mornings feature Michigan's Big Show with Michael Patrick Shiels.

The rest of WKZO's schedule is made up of syndicated conservative talk shows including The Clay Travis and Buck Sexton Show, Markley, Van Camp & Robbins, The Mark Levin Show, The Ben Shapiro Show, and The Ramsey Show. Coast to Coast AM with George Noory is heard overnights seven days a week.

Weekends include shows on money, health, real estate, law, auto repair, home repair, travel, gardening and bird watching. Some shows are paid brokered programming. Weekend syndicated hosts include Clark Howard, Kim Komando and Bill Handel. WKZO is also part of the Michigan News Network and carries world and national news from CBS News Radio.

== Sports ==
WKZO was the Southwest Michigan affiliate of the Detroit Tigers Radio Network(until 2026) and stiil is for the Detroit Lions Radio Network.

The station previously was affiliated with the Michigan State Spartans, and has since become the flagship station for the Kalamazoo Wings.

== History ==
=== 8AZ, KFGZ, WEMC ===
The station traces its roots back to 8AZ, an experimental station founded by John Fetzer in 1922 while he was a student at Emmanuel Missionary College (now Andrews University) in Berrien Springs.

The success of the experimental station, which was heard as far away as France, encouraged the college to look into starting a "real" radio station. The result was KFGZ, 'The Radio Lighthouse,' licensed in April 1923 and broadcasting at 1120 kHz with 500 watts of power. KFGZ's call sign was changed in 1925 to WEMC. KFGZ/WEMC operated as an independent radio station serving the St. Joseph River Valley with community information and Christian radio programming. The station was received across the eastern United States and into Canada, and a reception report once came in from a Dutch ship in the North Sea.

Despite the station's popularity, the fact that it operated non-commercially, with the college unwilling to allow the station to solicit financial donations from listeners, ultimately sealed its fate. By 1930, the college was looking to sell the station. (Andrews University returned to broadcasting in 1971, when the school signed on WAUS, a classical music station at 90.9 (later 90.7) on the FM dial.)

=== Move to Kalamazoo ===
Fetzer purchased the station himself for $2,500. He essentially ran the station as a one-man band, serving as technician, engineer, disc jockey, and salesman. When the Great Depression struck, Fetzer decided to move WEMC to Kalamazoo, which at the time was the largest city in Michigan that did not yet have its own radio station. The station began operations as WKZO in September 1931, and soon became a success. Famous alumni at WKZO include Paul Harvey, Tom Snyder, and Harry Caray.

In the 1930s, 1940s and 1950s, WKZO carried the CBS schedule of programs, during the Golden Age of Radio. Listeners heard dramas, comedies, news, sports, soap operas, game shows and big band broadcasts. It was during this time that local historian Willis Dunbar hosted such programs as Know Your City. In the 1950s, as network programming moved from radio to television, WKZO switched to a full-service Middle of the Road (MOR) station, with popular music, news and sports.

=== TV station ===
In 1950, a television station was added. Channel 3 WKZO-TV began broadcasting on in July. Because WKZO was a CBS Radio affiliate, WKZO-TV was primarily a CBS outlet, although as the only TV station in Kalamazoo, it also carried shows from NBC, ABC and the DuMont Television Network in its early days. In 1960, Fetzer expanded WKZO-TV's signal to cover all of West Michigan, and it became an exclusive CBS affiliate.

WKZO-AM-TV were the linchpins of a group of stations that, at its height, included two other stations in Michigan and television stations in Michigan, Nebraska and Iowa. Channel 3 was sold in 1985 and its call letters switched to WWMT.

=== AC music and talk ===
In the 1970s, WKZO's playlist shifted to adult contemporary music. Billboard magazine named WKZO the "Adult Contemporary Station of the Year" in 1977, and the station was subsequently honored by the Michigan state legislature with a concurrent resolution of tribute.

Fetzer sold off most of his properties in the 1980s, but held onto WKZO, as well as WJFM (now WBCT) in Grand Rapids until his death in 1991. His estate sold the station off in 1992, earning a handsome return on Fetzer's purchase of the station more than 60 years earlier.

WKZO converted to its present news/talk format in the early 1990s. In 2006, WKZO was acquired by Midwest Communications, based in Wausau, Wisconsin.

== See also ==
- G. Robert Vincent Voice Library – contains an archive of WKZO voice recordings
