= WFAT =

Radio station in Battle Creek, Michigan

Simulcasting WKZO Kalamazoo
- Battle Creek, Michigan; United States
- Broadcast area: (Daytime) (Nighttime)
- Frequency: 930 kHz
- Branding: Newsradio 590 and 106.9 FM WKZO

Programming
- Format: News/Talk
- Affiliations: Fox News Radio; Compass Media Networks; Premiere Networks; Westwood One; Detroit Lions; Detroit Red Wings; Detroit Tigers; Kalamazoo Wings

Ownership
- Owner: Midwest Communications; (Midwest Communications, Inc.)
- Sister stations: WNWN

History
- First air date: July 9, 1948
- Former call signs: WBCK (1948–2014); WTOU (2014–2019)
- Call sign meaning: W The FAT One (former branding)

Technical information
- Licensing authority: FCC
- Facility ID: 37459
- Class: B
- Power: 5,000 watts day 1,000 watts night
- Transmitter coordinates: 42°17′31″N 85°11′00″W
- Translator: 102.7 W274AQ (Battle Creek)

Links
- Public license information: Public file; LMS
- Webcast: Listen Live
- Website: wkzo.com

WFAT (930 AM) is a radio station in Battle Creek, Michigan, United States, owned by Midwest Communications. Established in 1948 as WBCK, the station airs a news/talk format, simulcasting WKZO 590 AM Kalamazoo.

== History ==
WBCK began broadcasting July 9, 1948, with a Detroit Tigers baseball game as its first program. The station was a Mutual affiliate. WBCK featured a full-service MOR/adult contemporary format for years, evolving into news/talk by the mid-1990s.

The sale of the Battle Creek Radio Group from Clear Channel Communications to Cumulus Media has been completed. 95.3 WBXX began to simulcast with the news/talk format of AM 930 and WBXX's former adult contemporary format moved to 104.9 (formerly WRCC). 95.3 FM became the permanent home of WBCK's news/talk format. On March 21, 2008, AM 930 dropped the simulcast with 95.3 FM and started airing a classic country format and became known as Country 93. The format later evolved from classic country to contemporary country. On April 10, 2012, WBCK changed their format to sports, branded as "The Score." Programming came from CBS Sports Radio. Current Radio assumed the station's license from Cumulus on August 31, 2013.

Midwest Communications purchased WBCK for $175,000 on January 23, 2014. The sale was approved by the FCC on March 26, 2014, and was consummated on July 1, 2014. Michiguide.com reported on May 23, 2014 that Midwest Communications had also purchased a LPFM translator from the Calvary Radio Network in Battle Creek (W274AQ on 102.7 MHz) for $45,000, with the intention of repeating WBCK. On July 1, 2014, WBCK changed its callsign to WTOU and then went silent on July 3. On February 2, 2015, WTOU returned to the air with a simulcast of urban AC-formatted WNWN 1560 AM.

On September 12, 2019, WTOU dropped the simulcast with WNWN/Portage and changed their format to classic hits, branded as The Fat One under new WFAT calls. The branding and calls were previously used by sister station WZOX.

On February 6, 2025, WFAT changed their format from classic hits to a simulcast of oldies-formatted WQXC-FM 100.9 Allegan, branded as "Cool FM".

On November 3, 2026, WFAT changed their format from a simulcast of oldies-formatted WQXC-FM to a simulcast of news/talk-formatted WKZO 590 AM Kalamazoo.
