= WNEV =

- Friars Point, Mississippi; United States
- Broadcast area: Clarksdale, Mississippi; Helena-West Helena, Arkansas
- Frequency: 98.7 MHz
- Branding: Force 3

Programming
- Format: Blues

Ownership
- Owner: L.T. Simes II & Raymond Simes

Technical information
- Licensing authority: FCC
- Facility ID: 164256
- Class: A
- ERP: 6,000 watts
- HAAT: 100 meters (330 ft)
- Transmitter coordinates: 34°21′57.4″N 90°38′12.1″W

Links
- Public license information: Public file; LMS
- Webcast: Listen live
- Website: force3radio.com

WNEV (98.7 FM) is a radio station licensed to Friars Point, Mississippi. The station broadcasts a Blues format and is owned by L.T. Simes II & Raymond Simes.
