= WKFR-FM =

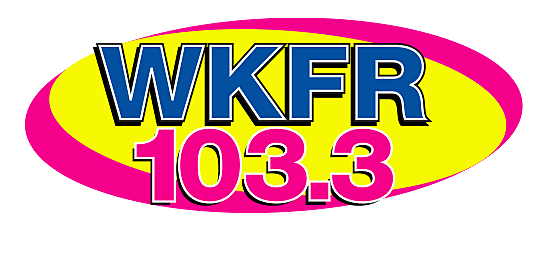
- Battle Creek, Michigan; United States
- Broadcast area: Battle Creek metropolitan area
- Frequency: 103.3 MHz (HD Radio)
- Branding: 103.3 KFR

Programming
- Format: contemporary hit radio
- Subchannels: HD2: WBXX simulcast (urban adult contemporary)
- Affiliations: Compass Media Networks; Westwood One

Ownership
- Owner: Townsquare Media; (Townsquare License, LLC)
- Sister stations: WKMI; WRKR

History
- First air date: June 11, 1963
- Former call signs: WELL-FM (1963–1964)
- Call sign meaning: Keener Fourteen

Technical information
- Licensing authority: FCC
- Facility ID: 14658
- Class: B
- ERP: 50,000 watts
- HAAT: 147 meters
- Transmitter coordinates: 42°21′20.1″N 85°20′28″W
- Translator: 102.5 W273AR (Paw Paw) (relays HD2)

Links
- Public license information: Public file; LMS
- Webcast: Listen live
- Website: wkfr.com

WKFR-FM (103.3 MHz 103.3 KFR) is a commercial radio station licensed to Battle Creek, Michigan. Owned by Townsquare Media, it airs a contemporary hit radio format. The station's studios and offices are on Jennings Drive in Kalamazoo.

WKFR-FM has an effective radiated power (ERP) of 50,000 watts, the maximum for most stations in Southern Michigan. Its transmitter is on North 44th Street at East E F Avenue in Augusta.

== History ==
The station signed on the air on June 11, 1963. Its original call sign was WELL-FM and it broadcast at 96.5 MHz. WELL-FM and its sister station, WELL (AM), simulcast their programming for most of the 1960s, but that changed in 1964 when both WELL-FM and WELL became WKFR-FM and AM. The AM station became Top 40 outlet as "Keener 14", while the FM station moved to 103.3 MHz. And by the late 1960s WKFR-FM had broken from the simulcast of WKFR and was airing an automated Beautiful Music format, playing quarter-hour sweeps of mostly instrumental songs.

In 1972, WKFR (AM), changed its call letters to WKNR after that call sign was dropped by the former WKNR in Detroit but their FM station remained WKFR-FM. By the end of the 1970s WKFR-FM had evolved from MOR "good music" to an AC format. Then in 1981 WKFR-FM inherited the now Top 40/CHR format from WKNR and has been keeping and retained it ever since.

On August 30, 2013, a deal was announced in which Townsquare Media would acquire 53 Cumulus Media stations, including WKFR-FM. The price tag was $238 million. The deal was part of Cumulus' acquisition of Dial Global. Both Townsquare and Dial Global were controlled by Oaktree Capital Management. The sale was consummated on November 14, 2013.
