= WBXX (FM) =

- Marshall, Michigan; United States
- Broadcast area: Battle Creek, Michigan
- Frequency: 104.9 MHz
- Branding: 102.5/104.9 The Block

Programming
- Format: Urban adult contemporary
- Affiliations: Compass Media Networks

Ownership
- Owner: Townsquare Media; (Townsquare License, LLC)
- Sister stations: WBCK

History
- First air date: 1968 (as WALM-FM)
- Former call signs: WRCC (9/5/06-9/18/07); WWKN (1/10/97-9/5/06); WRCC (3/18/96-1/10/97); WELL-FM (?-3/18/96); WALM-FM (1968-?)
- Call sign meaning: W Battle Creek MiX X (former branding)

Technical information
- Facility ID: 37463
- Class: A
- ERP: 6,000 watts
- HAAT: 100 meters
- Transmitter coordinates: 42°18′47″N 84°55′46″W
- Repeater: 102.5 WKFR-HD2 (Kalamazoo)

Links
- Webcast: Listen Live
- Website: wbxxfm.com

WBXX (104.9 MHz) is a radio station in Battle Creek, Michigan.

WBXX took over the 104.9 frequency formerly occupied by WRCC-FM in September 2007; its former 95.3 spot on the dial was taken over by WBCK-FM, and WRCC's classic rock format was discontinued.

As WBXX "B95", 95.3 FM was a very popular CHR/Top 40 station in the late 1980s and early 1990s. Despite the station's high ratings (especially with younger listeners), B95 was unsuccessful in terms of revenue because it played hip-hop and rap music that was unpopular with local advertisers. This led the station to change format to oldies and later adult contemporary, with which WBXX continued to broadcast initially after moving to 104.9.

Logo used until December 2007.

104.9 was originally WALM-FM (sister station to the now-defunct WALM 1260 AM in Albion, Michigan) and later WELL-FM with a middle-of-the-road format. The station first used the WRCC call sign in 1996, broadcasting a satellite-fed country format known as "Cereal City Country" which was unable to compete with powerhouses WBCT and WNWN-FM and received low Arbitron ratings. WRCC changed the following year to WWKN, "Keener 104-9" (a tribute to WKFR's original home at 1400 AM in the 1960s as "Keener 14"), playing oldies of the 1960s and 1970s. Eventually WWKN repositioned as "Super Hits 104-9" and then "Super Rock 104-9" (adjusting its format to classic hits) before changing to all-out classic rock as "Rock 104-9" and changing its calls back to WRCC.

logo used from 2007-2016

Mix 104-9 featured the syndicated Delilah show Sunday through Friday nights and played classic hits during its "Wayback Weekends". The station also aired the syndicated Bob and Sheri morning show.

On August 30, 2013 a deal was announced in which Townsquare Media would acquire 53 stations from Cumulus Media, including WBXX, for $238 million. The deal is part of Cumulus' acquisition of Dial Global; Townsquare and Dial Global are both controlled by Oaktree Capital Management. The sale to Townsquare was completed on November 14, 2013.

On the morning of January 29, 2016, WBXX flipped to alternative rock as "104.9 The Edge", filling, in part, the void left by WVIC dropping the format in March 2015. The station aired the Free Beer and Hot Wings show mornings and featured 104-minute blocks of commercial free music the rest of the day.

On January 16, 2023, WBXX dropped the alternative rock format and flipped to urban adult contemporary, branded as "102.5/104.9 The Block" (simulcast on WKFR-HD2 in Kalamazoo and translator W273AR (102.5 FM)).
