= WNWN (FM) =

Coordinates: 42.058°N 84.997°W

- Coldwater, Michigan; United States
- Broadcast area: Kalamazoo-Battle Creek, Michigan
- Frequency: 98.5 MHz
- Branding: WIN 98-5

Programming
- Format: Country

Ownership
- Owner: Midwest Communications; (Midwest Communications, Inc.)
- Sister stations: WKZO, WTOU, WVFM, WZOX, WFAT

History
- First air date: November 11, 1950
- Former call signs: WTVB-FM (11/11/1950-1/1964); WANG (1/1964-12/21/1977); WNWN (12/21/1977-10/1/1995); WNWN-FM (1995–2019)
- Former frequencies: 98.3 MHz
- Call sign meaning: WiN 98.5

Technical information
- Licensing authority: FCC
- Facility ID: 67764
- Class: B
- ERP: 50,000 watts
- HAAT: 143 meters (469 ft)
- Repeater: 1660 WZOX (Kalamazoo)

Links
- Public license information: Public file; LMS
- Webcast: Listen Live
- Website: wincountry.com

WNWN (98.5 MHz, "Win 98-5") is an FM radio station broadcasting a country music format. Licensed to Coldwater, Michigan with studios in Battle Creek, it first began broadcasting in 1950 under the WTVB-FM call sign at 98.3 on the FM dial and spent most of its early existence as a simulcast of sister station WTVB before changing to its current calls, format, and frequency.

Win 98-5 is consistently one of the top-rated radio stations in the Battle Creek market.

WNWN programming is also heard on WZOX 1660 in Kalamazoo, Michigan and translator 95.5 W238AL in Portage, allowing the station's programming to better penetrate the Kalamazoo market.

== History ==
The station began as the FM counterpart to WTVB in Coldwater. The WTVB call letters were assigned in 1949 to Twin Valley Broadcasters Inc. for a 1590 kHz daytime AM station in Coldwater. By December 1950, Broadcasting reported that WTVB-FM was on the air on 98.3 MHz as a Class A FM facility carrying a 15-hour schedule. In 1952, the FCC granted WTVB-FM a license for a construction permit, as modified, authorizing the new FM station.

In 1960, the FCC granted WTVB-FM authority to move from 98.3 MHz to 98.5 MHz and upgrade from a Class A facility with 260 watts ERP to a Class B facility with 6.3 kW ERP. In January 1964, the FCC call-letter listings in Broadcasting showed the station changing from WTVB-FM to WANG(FM), with Twin Valley Broadcasters Inc. listed as licensee.

The station became WNWN by early 1978, when Broadcasting listed WNWN among newly assigned call letters for existing FM station WANG in Coldwater. In 1979, the FCC granted WNWN(FM) a construction permit to relocate its transmitter and antenna to Herricksville Road near Old 27 in Girard, Michigan, change the studio and remote-control location to 174 N. Angola Road in Coldwater, and operate with 50 kW ERP and an antenna height of 470 feet.

By the early 1980s, WNWN was operating as a country station known as "Stereo Country 98". Broadcaster Jim Higgs, who had previously worked at WKMI in Kalamazoo, moved to WNWN as an announcer and later became program director before leaving in 1983. In 1995, Broadcasting & Cable described WNWN-FM as a contemporary country station on 98.5 MHz with 50 kW and a 500-foot antenna.

Midwest Communications acquired WNWN-FM as part of a four-station transaction involving WHEZ(AM), WFAT-FM, WTVB(AM), and WNWN-FM. Broadcasting & Cable listed the sale price as $4 million, with Midwest Communications Inc. as buyer and Tri-State Broadcasting Co. Inc. as seller. The M Street Journal also reported in February 1995 that Midwest Communications was acquiring Tri-State Broadcasting's four-station Coldwater/Portage group for $4 million.

The station's call sign was changed from WNWN-FM to WNWN on September 16, 2019. Midwest Communications brands the station as WIN 98.5 with the slogan "Your Country" and lists its format as country. The station is also listed as being heard on 1660 AM and 95.5 FM in Kalamazoo.
