= WZOX =

Simulcasts WNWN Coldwater

Kalamazoo, Michigan; United States
- Broadcast area: Kalamazoo–Portage metropolitan area
- Frequency: 1660 kHz
- Branding: WIN 98-5

Programming
- Language: English
- Format: Country music

Ownership
- Owner: Midwest Communications; (Midwest Communications, Inc.)
- Sister stations: WKZO; WNWN; WVFM; WTOU; WFAT

History
- First air date: September 23, 1998
- Former call signs: WQSN (1998–2007); WQLR (2007–2020); WTOU (2020–2025)
- Call sign meaning: Kalamazoo

Technical information
- Licensing authority: FCC
- Facility ID: 87325
- Class: B
- Power: 10,000 watts (day); 1,000 watts (night)
- Transmitter coordinates: 42°14′11.2″N 85°34′37.0″W
- Translator: 95.5 W238AL (Portage)

Links
- Public license information: Public file; LMS
- Webcast: Listen live
- Website: wincountry.com

WZOX (1660 kHz) is a commercial radio station licensed by the Federal Communications Commission (FCC) to operate from facilities located in Kalamazoo, Michigan.

== History ==
The station began as the "expanded band" twin to a station operating on the standard AM band. On March 17, 1997, the FCC announced that eighty-eight stations had been given permission to move to newly available "expanded Band" transmitting frequencies, ranging from 1610 to 1700 kHz, with then-WQSN in Kalamazoo authorized to move from 1470 to 1660 kHz.

A construction permit for the expanded band station was assigned the call letters WQSN on October 1, 1998, concurrent with the call sign of the original WQSN on 1470 AM changing to WKLZ. The FCC's initial policy was that both the original station and its expanded band counterpart could operate simultaneously for up to five years, after which owners would have to turn in one of the two licenses, depending on whether they preferred the new assignment or elected to remain on the original frequency, although this deadline was extended multiple times. It was ultimately decided to transfer full operations to the expanded band station, and on February 20, 2006, the original station on 1470 AM, now WKLZ, signed off the air for the last time and the license was deleted.

The station had been licensed to Fairfield Broadcasting as WQSN. It was sold to Midwest Communications in 2006. The FCC approved a callsign change on March 26, 2007 to WQLR, the former callsign of WVFM, an existing FM music station owned by Midwest Communications in Kalamazoo.

The station flipped from sports radio to urban adult contemporary on December 1, 2020.

On December 18, 2020, the station became WTOU, after exchanging call letters with a station on 1560 AM. On April 2, 2025, the station became WZOX, after exchanging call letters with a station on 96.5 FM. The station eventually became a simulcast of WNWN, a country station.
