= WKBD-TV =

Television station in Detroit

- Detroit, Michigan; United States
- Channels: Digital: 34 (UHF); Virtual: 50
- Branding: CW Detroit 50

Programming
- Affiliations: 50.1: The CW; for others, see § Subchannels

Ownership
- Owner: CBS Television Stations; (Detroit Television Station WKBD Inc.)
- Sister stations: WWJ-TV

History
- First air date: January 10, 1965
- Former call signs: WKBD (1965–1966, 1984–2009); WKBD-TV (1966–1984)
- Former channel numbers: Analog: 50 (UHF, 1965–2009); Digital: 14 (UHF, 2000–2019)
- Former affiliations: Independent (1965–1986, 1994–1995, 2023–2024); United (secondary, 1967); Fox (1986–1994); UPN (1995–2006); The CW (2006–2023)
- Call sign meaning: "Kaiser Broadcasting Detroit"

Technical information
- Licensing authority: FCC
- Facility ID: 51570
- ERP: 285 kW
- HAAT: 290.6 m (953 ft)
- Transmitter coordinates: 42°29′1″N 83°18′44″W

Links
- Public license information: Public file; LMS
- Website: www.cbsnews.com/detroit/detroit-50/

WKBD-TV (channel 50), branded as CW Detroit 50, is a television station in Detroit, Michigan, United States, affiliated with The CW. It is owned by the CBS Television Stations group alongside WWJ-TV (channel 62), a CBS owned-and-operated station. The two stations share studios on Eleven Mile Road in the Detroit suburb of Southfield, where WKBD-TV's transmitter is also located.

WKBD began broadcasting on January 10, 1965. It was the first UHF station built by Kaiser Broadcasting as part of what eventually became a chain of seven stations in major U.S. markets. Channel 50 started as an all-sports station with telecasts of the Detroit Red Wings and Detroit Pistons as features, but it soon grew into an active independent station producing an array of local programs alongside sports and syndicated reruns. Between 1966 and 1977, Lou Gordon hosted a nationally syndicated program based in Detroit and syndicated to the other Kaiser stations; Gordon's 1967 interview with George W. Romney, in which he decried "brainwashing" on a trip to Vietnam, made national news and was credited with dashing his presidential aspirations and ending his political career. In addition, Gordon raised the station's profile among Detroit-area viewers. Among its local programming efforts, WKBD produced a local newscast from 1968 to 1970. Kaiser sold its entire broadcasting operation to Field Communications in 1977.

As part of the dissolution of Field Communications, Cox Enterprises acquired WKBD in 1984. The Red Wings moved their games that year to WXON (channel 20), while channel 50 kept the Pistons. Under Cox, WKBD started a 10 p.m. local newscast in 1985, affiliated with Fox in 1986, and moved into its present studio building in 1988. During this time, WKBD was one of the nation's strongest independents and grew further as the Fox network matured in the early 1990s. In 1993, Cox sold WKBD to Paramount Stations Group; when Fox moved its affiliation to WJBK-TV, previously the CBS affiliate, Paramount withheld channel 50 from picking up CBS so that it could join its own network, UPN, at launch in January 1995. The effect of the switch was to put WJBK in competition for the 10 p.m. news audience with WKBD, a fight channel 50 lost.

Paramount's parent company, Viacom, merged with CBS in 2000, bringing WKBD-TV and CBS-owned WWJ-TV under one roof. WKBD's news operation was briefly extended to serve the previously newsless WWJ-TV, but this failed to attract viewers, and it was shut down in 2002. After having the Red Wings, Pistons, and Detroit Tigers rights at the same time, all three professional teams abandoned WKBD between 2003 and 2005. When UPN and The WB merged to form The CW in 2006, WKBD-TV and twelve other CBS-owned UPN stations were among its first affiliates. CBS sold its stake in The CW in 2022 and withdrew its eight remaining affiliates from the network the next year, only to have WKBD return to the network in September 2024. The station airs local newscasts as part of CBS News Detroit, the news operation and streaming service for WWJ-TV established in 2023.

== Channel 50 prior to WKBD-TV ==
Channel 50 was first assigned to Detroit in April 1952, when the Federal Communications Commission (FCC) lifted a three-and-a-half-year freeze on new TV station grants and opened up the ultra high frequency (UHF) band for TV use. Within weeks, Goodwill Stations, owner of WJR radio in Detroit, announced the intent of applying for four station licenses which would operate as a regional network—UHF channel 50 in Detroit, VHF channel 11 in Toledo, Ohio, VHF channel 12 in Flint and VHF channel 5 in Bay City. Goodwill hoped to affiliate the Detroit channel 50 station with CBS. The Flint application was the only one to make it to the air as WJRT-TV in 1958.

Woodward Broadcasting, which applied later, withdrew its bid when it purchased the channel 62 construction permit belonging to the United Auto Workers. That cleared the way for the other applicant, Booth Radio and Television Stations (owner of WJLB and WBRI radio), to be granted the permit. By this time, however, it was becoming clear that UHF telecasting was experiencing economic issues stemming from inequalities with VHF stations. Booth returned the permit at the end of 1954 and also surrendered a permit for another UHF station in Saginaw. Woodward then filed for and received permission to move its proposed station, WBID-TV, to channel 50. It sought to remedy the VHF-UHF issue by asking the FCC to make a channel exchange between Detroit and Toledo, where it owned a construction permit for WTOH-TV on channel 79, so that Detroit would be all-VHF (with WBID-TV on channel 11 instead of 50) and Toledo all-UHF. WBID-TV remained on the books despite a lack of action on the petition. In November 1956, it and 82 other UHF stations not in operation received letters from the FCC asking for additional information in support of their request for more time to build. The permit survived, but in February 1960, the FCC circulated another round of such letters to WBID-TV and 53 other unbuilt stations. That November, the WBID-TV permit and 25 others in similar situations were deleted by the commission.

== History ==
=== Kaiser and Field ownership (1965–1983) ===
==== Signing on with sports ====
On August 31, 1962, Kaiser Industries, the conglomerate owned by California industrialist Henry J. Kaiser, applied to the FCC for three new UHF TV stations: channel 38 in Chicago; channel 41 in Burlington, New Jersey (to serve Philadelphia); and channel 50 in Detroit. This was the second application by Kaiser Broadcasting for TV stations on the U.S. mainland: it already owned stations in Hawaii and had requested UHF channels in the Los Angeles and San Francisco areas. Richard C. Block, the president of Kaiser Broadcasting, told Broadcasting magazine that the company had "an abiding faith that there is right now a need for additional TV service ... and UHF obviously provided the opportunity". The applications called for a general-appeal program lineup, local and live talent, and local news. The FCC granted the construction permit for the Detroit station on January 3, 1963; it was the third permit granted, after the two California stations.

We felt that someone should go out and build a UHF station to keep the all-channel bill going—and do it right ... manufacturers were saying: "Nobody is putting any money into this thing, so why do it?"

— Richard C. Block, Kaiser Broadcasting executive, on why WKBD was chosen as its first UHF station

With the permit granted, Kaiser sent John Serrao, manager of its KHVH-TV in Honolulu, to Detroit to ascertain plans for WKBD ("Kaiser Broadcasting, Detroit"). Serrao had previously been an advertising sales representative for WWJ-TV (channel 4) in the 1950s. The station's programming plan was unveiled in September: a six-hour-a-day lineup consisting almost entirely of local and other sports. The idea originated from Honolulu, where KHVH-TV aired a nine-hour-long sports cavalcade, Kaiser Sports Central, on weekends. The proposed programming was a decided break with convention. In Variety, the proposed WKBD lineup was called "one of the first—if not the first aside from ethnic—attempts at truly specialized programming". Channel 50 would launch with games of the Detroit Red Wings pro hockey team and Detroit Pistons pro basketball plus sporting events from the University of Michigan, Michigan State University, and University of Detroit. In October, officials in Southfield approved construction of the station's facilities, including a 1,000-foot (300 m) candelabra tower designed to eventually support other TV stations. The forthcoming station led to forecasts of a surge in interest in converting VHF-only sets to tune the UHF band and a shortage of television servicemen to install a projected 200,000 UHF converters. The station would also have three remote units for telecasting events beyond its studios.

WKBD first signed on the air on January 10, 1965. WKBD began broadcasting at 5 p.m. on that date, with its first programs being two college basketball games (taped the day before): Michigan State University vs. the University of Iowa and the University of Detroit against the University of Dayton, followed by a live NHL game between the Detroit Red Wings and the Chicago Blackhawks. Sports was, Serrao admitted, a strategy to cement WKBD in Detroit homes before broadening the station's mix of programming. He also believed that sports would be an important way for independent stations to establish themselves in their markets. Despite that, channel 50 remained sports-heavy in its first fall television season, with heavy doses of college and professional sports as well as some reruns including The Joey Bishop Show and My Friend Flicka, and a daily syndicated show hosted by former WXYZ-TV personality Soupy Sales.

==== Local shows and Lou Gordon ====
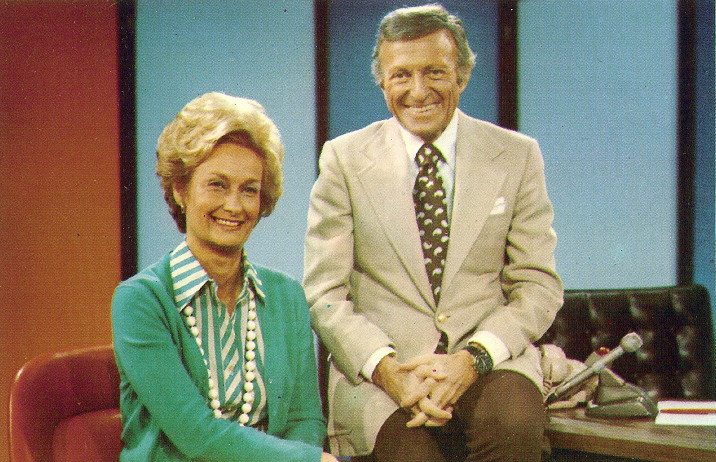
Jackie and Lou Gordon

On February 6, 1966, WKBD began a talk show featuring journalist Lou Gordon. The Lou Gordon Show formed part of a surge in local programming at channel 50. By July 1966, WKBD was live and local for 30 hours a week, with such programs as The Shirley Eder Show, featuring entertainment interviews; The Paul Winters Show, a call-in program; a country and western music hour; and Sports Dial, a sports interview program hosted by Joe Falls and George Puscas of the Detroit Free Press. An afternoon children's show, Captain Detroit, debuted in the fall of 1965 and hosted by Dick Zappe; the program was also hosted by comedian Johnny Ginger and Tom Ryan under the "Sgt. Sacto" persona. (Note: The Captain [City] children's show format was used on the other Kaiser stations and originated at KHVH-TV as Captain Honolulu, which also had a host nicknamed "Sgt. Sacto".) Bill Kennedy joined WKBD in 1969 from CKLW-TV in Windsor, Ontario, to host a daily afternoon movie. He helmed another popular feature, Sunday Afternoon Movies, which often outdrew the network affiliates in the ratings. In addition, Kennedy conducted interviews syndicated to the other Kaiser stations. By 1969, WKBD-TV was the first UHF station to overtake a VHF outlet in the ratings; it had surpassed CKLW-TV, originally owned by RKO General which as a Canadian station was hindered by its commitments to Canadian content and ultimately a forced sale to Canadian interests.

But, almost from the beginning, it was sharp-tongued Lou Gordon who made viewers—important and ordinary—aware of WKBD... For 12 years, until his death at 60 in 1977, Gordon baited guests and railed against big corporations on his Channel 50 show. Utilities were particular targets if he thought they were gouging the "little people". Monday mornings in Detroit's workplaces, Gordon's latest escapade was frequently the subject of coffee break conversations.

— Bettelou Peterson, Detroit Free Press television critic

Gordon went national in 1967, under the title Lou Gordon's Hot Seat, and began to be distributed to the other Kaiser stations. The first program featured a 35-minute interview with George W. Romney, the governor of Michigan, in which he mentioned being "brainwashed" by military officials on a trip to Vietnam and stated that he did not want to be a vice presidential candidate in 1968. Romney's claim of brainwashing—which made the front page of The New York Times in addition to national media coverage—was later attributed to presidential historian Theodore H. White with ending his hopes of running for president (Note: White's appraisal has also been cited in contemporary media coverage on WKBD and Lou Gordon.) and his political career. In 1973, Romney, then the Secretary of Housing and Urban Development, appeared on Gordon's show again, only to walk off the set when Gordon replayed his comments from six years earlier.

Gordon's program regularly generated scoops. A 1971 front-page story in the Free Press was generated based on an advance interview conducted by Gordon which revealed an attempt by Pentagon press officials to encourage the introduction of favorable resolutions at the Disabled American Veterans convention in Detroit. In 1974, his interview with Henry Ford II led to Ford announcing Lee Iacocca as the next president of the Ford Motor Company; a federal judge pronounced himself in favor of the impeachment of Richard Nixon; and another appearance led to an investigation of fraud in television repair. These stories made their way into local and national newspapers. His talk show had higher ratings in Detroit than the national programs of Mike Douglas or Johnny Carson, or local travel host George Pierrot. In 1975, when he signed a new deal with Kaiser, it was airing on six of the company's stations plus three others. The program continued until Gordon died in his sleep on May 25, 1977. WKBD attempted to replace Gordon with a show hosted by Barry Farber in his former timeslot, running from November 1977 to June 1978.

==== Network aspirations, local news and financial issues ====
WKBD briefly gained a network affiliation in May 1967, when it became the Detroit affiliate of the short-lived United Network; the network only ever distributed one program, The Las Vegas Show. At the same time, Kaiser had similar aspirations. After helping a third party secure a construction permit for WKBF-TV in Cleveland, Ohio, of which it acquired operational control, Kaiser announced plans in September 1967 to launch a network of their own by 1970, programmed by the individual stations' most successful local efforts. By 1968, Kaiser had invested over $36 million (equivalent to $333 million in 2025) into UHF broadcasting groupwide.

Under Kaiser Broadcasting ownership, in 1968, WKBD began producing a nightly newscast at 10 p.m.; this was part of a large investment by Kaiser into forming news departments for most of their stations. Kaiser's commitment to news programming groupwide wavered, sometimes in the span of months. In April, half the news department at WKBD was fired, and the news director was dismissed; the group then began expanding programming again, encouraged by ratings success in Cleveland and Detroit. Ultimately, the entire news operation was closed after only two years, due to a weak economy and reluctance to embrace UHF stations; WKBD's news operation was the only one of Kaiser's news departments to turn a profit, though ratings were still much lower than expected. The 10 p.m. news had 50,000 viewers per an American Research Bureau survey, capturing just 10 percent of the audience at that hour. Seventeen employees lost their jobs in Detroit.

By 1970, WKBD had become the dominant UHF station in the group and the only profitable one. Losses accelerated throughout the company in 1968 after the sign-on of WKBF and KBHK-TV in San Francisco, and the Los Angeles station KBSC-TV only operated with a barebones schedule, but both KBHK and KBSC continued to broadcast with hopes of a television network still in mind. WKBG-TV in Boston itself lost a total of $11 million from the time it had signed on in 1966 until November 1970. The rest of the stations were not expected to turn a profit until 1973, and all operated off of bank accounts funded by revenue from Kaiser Industries. WKBD was not immune to issues: much of the station's initial news-gathering equipment, purchased in 1964, was in black-and-white, and Kaiser had to upgrade facilities after underestimating the original transmitter's 30 kW output. Sixteen additional WKBD employees were downsized earlier in 1970, including "Sgt. Sacto" Tom Ryan, resulting in Captain Detroit's cancellation. Kaiser Industries' status as an industrial conglomerate was seen as a reason for the company's ability to absorb such onerous financial losses in UHF broadcasting.

A minority 22.5 percent stake in Kaiser Broadcasting's holdings (excluding KBSC and Kaiser's radio stations) was sold to Field Communications on May 26, 1972, concurrent with Kaiser purchasing a majority 77.5 percent stake in Field's Chicago station, WFLD-TV.

==== The Ghoul ====
To say that The Ghoul Show is one long Polish joke interrupted by a boring monster movie ... is not far from the truth. But it is also—in a spontaneous, crazy way—a very funny show.

— Fawn Bifoss, Detroit Free Press reporter

One of Kaiser's final syndicated efforts was Creature Features with The Ghoul, which originated from Kaiser's Cleveland station, WKBF, starting in 1971. Portrayed by Ron Sweed, The Ghoul was conceived as a spiritual successor to Ghoulardi, a Cleveland horror host character created by Ernie Anderson whom Sweed idolized. Focusing The Ghoul's act towards lowbrow humor, explosions, kitschiness and slapstick, Sweed's program found a cult following, prompting Kaiser to syndicate the show to WKBD in 1972, then to KBHK and WKBG. While the show had mixed results in San Francisco and Boston (and failed in Chicago, when it replaced Jerry G. Bishop's Svengoolie at WFLD) it proved very popular in Detroit.

The Ghoul was cancelled in the spring of 1975, a precursor to WKBF's own shutdown later that April. While Sweed sued Kaiser for the intellectual property rights to the Ghoul character, WKBD-TV briefly revived the program in August 1975. Sweed moved the show to WXON (channel 20) in September 1976 after prevailing in court and continued to portray the character on various Cleveland and Detroit stations over the next four decades.

==== Field takes over ====
Kaiser sold the group to Field outright in January 1977 for a combined $42.625 million (equivalent to $226 million in 2025) as part of a larger disposition of Kaiser Industries's assets. Under Field, the station had news updates with WWJ radio host Byron MacGregor that it aired alongside the syndicated Independent Network News and later a simulcast of the new CNN Headline News service. Counterprogramming became a hallmark of channel 50, in particular when the station programmed a tribute to M*A*S*H, which it held the rerun rights for, on the night of the final first-run episode airing over CBS and WJBK on February 28, 1983. WKBD's airing of the pilot episode at 8 p.m. that evening yielded a 31 rating and 43 share, both all-time records for the station. Bill Kennedy continued to host the daily One O' Clock Movie until retiring in January 1983, with former WXYZ-TV personality Sonny Eliot replacing him as host. The final installment of the Sunday Bill Kennedy at the Movies aired on December 4, 1983.

WKBD also occasionally aired programs that the Detroit network affiliates opted not to clear. When The Merv Griffin Show moved to CBS in 1969, CBS affiliate WJBK-TV declined to air the program, which appeared in Detroit on channel 50. In the mid-1970s, NBC debuted two programs on Saturday nights that its affiliate, WWJ-TV, did not carry; it had already scheduled local films that made more money and did not air Weekend or Saturday Night Live, which NBC offered to channel 50 for air in the market. For part of 1978, it aired The Tomorrow Show after the station—now WDIV—dropped it due to low ratings. When WDIV ceased airing Late Night with David Letterman in early September 1983 to carry the syndicated Thicke of the Night, WKBD agreed to clear both it and Friday Night Videos. (WDIV had previously tape-delayed Late Night to carry Entertainment Tonight, which was easier to sell local advertising.) Late Night failed to catch on in the ratings on WKBD, which dropped the show in mid-January 1984; WDIV picked it back up by August.

In 1981, the station's coverage of the Red Wings diminished from 25 to 15 games a year, with some telecasts migrating to the pay service ON TV, which aired over WXON in Detroit. ON TV in 1982–83, its final season, aired 15 home games of each of the Red Wings and Pistons. WKBD carried select Michigan Panthers games during the team's two years of existence in 1983 and 1984; when the USFL pressured the Panthers to nullify the contract prior to coverage of their first game, the station sued the league and quickly settled, allowing WKBD to carry the game.

=== Cox ownership, news expansion and Fox affiliation (1983–1993) ===
Following a family dispute over the company's future, Field Communications placed their entire station group up for sale in July 1982. The liquidation process took place on a per-station level, with Field's Chicago, Boston and San Francisco outlets sold to separate owners at the end of 1982. Cox Communications purchased WKBD for $70 million on May 18, 1983 (equivalent to $226 million in 2025), contingent on Cox divesting their existing cable systems in the market. For Cox, WKBD represented the chain's seventh television station and one of the most successful: Nielsen ratings in 1982 ranked WKBD as the highest-rated UHF independent in the country. (Note: The final Field station, WKBS-TV in Philadelphia, signed off permanently after failing to secure a buyer by the liquidation deadline.) The sale closed in March 1984.

One of the station's first decisions under Cox was to decide it could no longer devote time to carry both of the Red Wings and Pistons. It chose the Pistons, who had higher ratings; beginning in the 1984–85 season, the Red Wings moved their games to WXON. The Red Wings' tenure at WXON lasted only two years; the team returned to WKBD for the 1986–87 season.

During the changeover, Sonny Eliot relinquished hosting duties for the One O' Clock Movie but was retained with a one-year contract extension. As Eliot previously worked in the market as a weatherman, this spurred speculation of a full-fledged newscast possibly replacing the station's simulcast of Headline News in the 10 p.m. hour. At the start of 1985, WKBD announced the debut of a 10 p.m. newscast later in the year, helmed by existing update anchor Glenn Ray and Amyre Makupson. The station's public affair director, lead editorial board writer and host of the mid-morning program Morning Break, Makupson joined WKBD in 1977 from WGPR-TV (channel 62), the first Black-owned television station in the mainland United States. Debuting in August 1985, the newscast also featured weathercaster Randy Bhirdo and former WJBK sportscaster Ray Lane.

WKBD, along with Cox-owned KTVU in Oakland, California, and KDNL-TV in St. Louis, Missouri, became Fox charter affiliates on October 9, 1986, with the debut of The Late Show with Joan Rivers. While Fox's initial affiliate base consisted largely of UHF independents in comparison to traditional "Big Three" affiliates on the VHF dial, network executive Garth Ancier was enthusiastic about WKBD, calling the station "fully competitive" in a market with "incredible" ratings. WKBD program director Paul Prange considered Fox to be "the best shot of literally putting together a fourth network ... it's about time the networks got some competition". In the May 1988 Nielsen ratings, WKBD tied with WGN-TV as the highest-rated independent in the country in early evenings, with Fox's Saturday night lineup competitive against Tigers baseball on WDIV and ABC fare on WXYZ-TV. Still, WKBD opted to drop Fox's late-night offerings in early 1988 after the failure of The Wilton North Report.

The station was buoyed by success in 1988 with Red Wings and Pistons coverage, first-run syndication hits and Fox's weekend lineup stabilizing. Prange credited Fox with giving the station "a certain energy" independent stations could not generate themselves; in particular, The Simpsons emerged as a breakout hit for Fox in 1990, with the show winning the time slot in the Detroit market in consecutive weeks by that March. A recurring call-in talk show with Michigan governor James J. Blanchard launched over WKBD in September 1988 and carried statewide via the station's large cable footprint. Later, Detroit Lions preseason football was broadcast on channel 50 from 1990 to 1994.

Cox continued to invest in WKBD. A larger physical plant was inaugurated on May 24, 1988, adjacent to the original facilities in Southfield, which were originally intended as temporary and likened to a Quonset hut and "a Cracker Jack box"; this building was later repurposed for storage. The new facility allowed for further news expansion with an on-air set incorporating the newsroom, and by April 10, 1989, an extension of The Ten O'Clock News to an hour-long broadcast, even as WKBD's efforts in February 1989—a 5 rating and 7 share—trailed third-place WJBK's 11 p.m. news with a 9 rating and 17 share. The expanded news hour was modeled on KTVU's successful 10 p.m. news program. By July 1991, WKBD claimed to have Detroit's third highest-rated late evening news, drawing larger numbers than WJBK at 11 p.m., a claim WJBK disputed. General manager Duane Kell told the Detroit News, "our goal is to be the No. 1 late news program in the market by 1995."

=== Sale to Paramount and UPN affiliation (1993–1999) ===
Cox put both of its Fox affiliates—KTVU and WKBD—on the market in November 1992. This announcement drew industry surprise as Cox's financial position was regarded as strong; in a statement, Cox CEO James C. Kennedy said the company was proud of both stations, had "no overwhelming desire to sell them", and considered them "extremely successful". Rumored as one of several potential suitors, Paramount Stations Group purchased WKBD in June 1993. Terms were not disclosed, but the purchase price was estimated to be between $100 million and $125 million, or as high as $200 million. After the sale closed in October 1993, Paramount announced the formation of a new broadcast network in a joint venture with United Television, but management said WKBD would continue to honor their existing Fox affiliation agreement. When Paramount purchased WKBD, it was among the five highest-rated Fox affiliates in the country.

We had no idea it was coming. But we believe it's going to be an easy transition for us... Remember that Fox only broadcasts two hours a day. It's a very small part of our schedule... I think we're going to do at least as well as we have before, and possibly better.

— Paul Prange, WKBD program director

On May 23, 1994, WJBK-TV owner New World Communications announced a groupwide affiliation deal with Fox, displacing CBS from that station after a span of 45 years. When CBS failed to lure either WDIV or WXYZ-TV as a replacement affiliate, the network approached Paramount about a purchase of WKBD due to the station having an existing news department, but Paramount reportedly turned down an offer of between $120 million and $130 million. Unable to secure a higher-profile station, CBS purchased WGPR-TV from the International Free and Accepted Modern Masons, later renaming it WWJ-TV. Fox programming moved from WKBD to WJBK on December 12, 1994, but Fox Kids remained on channel 50 as WJBK declined to pick it up. WKBD continued to carry Fox Kids in early afternoons until the fall of 1998, when the program block moved to WADL (channel 38).

Under Paramount, WKBD committed to become an affiliate of UPN in late August 1994. UPN only programmed for two nights at launch, enabling the station to continue carrying Pistons and Red Wings games with minimal preemptions, which was not possible in WKBD's last year with Fox. The station also acquired the over-the-air rights to Detroit Tigers baseball from WDIV beginning with the 1995 season via a five-year, $25 million contract. A primetime movie showcase was reinstated on nights UPN did not program, with off-network reruns airing on Thursday nights, including reruns of The Simpsons in the same time slot it had previously held on Fox. This placement of Simpsons reruns came after the station received substantial complaints when Fox moved the show from Thursday to Sunday nights.

WJBK's switch to Fox also resulted in their late-evening newscast moving to 10 p.m., directly opposite WKBD. The first week after the switch saw channel 50 fall to fifth place in prime time ratings without Fox programming, and WJBK besting WKBD at 10 p.m., a pattern that never changed. WKBD's problems were exacerbated by their sports coverage: in the May 1995 sweeps, the 10 p.m. news start time was delayed 10 times due to overruns in game coverage. The newscasts were revamped to have a more updated on-air look, eschewing their "no-frills" presentation. UPN proved a poor lead-in for WKBD's news: when the network suffered a year-over-year decline of 50 percent in the fall of 1998, WJBK-TV's 10 p.m. newscast outdrew WKBD's news by a 2–1 margin. Attempting to draw on WKBD's local sports coverage, the 10 p.m. news was reduced to 30 minutes, with the second half devoted to an ensemble sportscast hosted by Lane, Tim Swor, Mickey Redmond and Karen Newman. While ratings improved modestly in late 1999, co-anchor Dave Scott was replaced with market veteran Rich Fisher, a choice made owing to Fisher's reputation in the market.

=== Merger into WWJ-TV (1999–2006) ===
Paramount's parent company, Viacom, purchased half ownership of UPN from United Television in 1996 and the remainder in 1999. Viacom purchased CBS Corporation on September 7, 1999, creating a duopoly with WWJ-TV. Unlike other Viacom CBS-UPN duopolies created by the merger where the CBS-owned station had a long-established dominant news department, WKBD was regarded as the larger, higher-rated station, and had a local news presence as opposed to WWJ. WKBD general manager Mike Dunlop was retained to head both stations, with operations consolidated at WKBD's Southfield facilities; seven technical employees lost their jobs in the transition.

By April 2001, WKBD's newscast now ranked as the least-watched in the market and continued to see audience declines against WJBK. Despite this, the station began producing an 11 p.m. weeknight newscast for WWJ-TV, using WKBD's air talent and reporters. Discussions of WKBD's news department producing news for WWJ had been underway prior to the CBS-Viacom merger; at least one dress rehearsal of a channel 62 newscast had been conducted. General manager Mike Dunlop was dismissed in August 2001, due to the continued ratings challenges: from sign-on to sign-off, both stations each drew half the audience of third-place WJBK. By February 2002, WKBD's newscast was repositioned to attract a younger audience with newly appointed lead anchors Pallas Hupe and Donna Terrell, while Fisher and Makupson were reassigned to anchor for WWJ exclusively. Fisher left WWJ in late May, prompting Terrell and WKBD reporter Harry Hariston to alternate as Makupson's co-anchor on the WWJ newscast, resulting in Tom Long of The Detroit News to suggest the purportedly different newscasts were the "attack of the clones".

I'm sorry, very sorry, that [the newscast] is canceled, but it's strictly business. When I'm thinking with my head but not my heart, there's plenty of eyeballs out on the street. Detroit news viewers are going to know what's going on, the viewers are going to get their news.

— Amyre Makupson, former WKBD–WWJ news anchor

Rumors emerged that Viacom executive Dennis Swanson planned to close the WKBD–WWJ news operation, the last newsroom Viacom inherited from Paramount that was still in operation. When contacted by a Free Press reporter, these rumors were met with lukewarm responses from station executives. Viacom ultimately signed a five-year contract with WXYZ-TV to produce a 10 p.m. newscast for WKBD, cancelling WWJ's 11 p.m. news outright. In November 2002, WKBD's 10 p.m. news posted a 2.8 rating, far behind WJBK's 7.8 rating. Fifty of the combined newsroom's 70 employees were not retained when the newscasts ended on December 4, 2002. Titled UPN Detroit Action News, the replacement WXYZ-TV newscast on WKBD was estimated to save Viacom approximately $10 million annually in expenses, while also providing WXYZ an opportunity to showcase their higher-rated newscasts to UPN's younger demographics. Failing to compete against WJBK, the WXYZ-produced 10 p.m. broadcast was canceled on December 3, 2004, with WKBD filling the timeslot with off-network sitcom reruns.

Through the early 2000s, WKBD's local sports coverage came at the expense of UPN programming, which was frequently preempted and moved to the weekends. All three teams left the station in a span of two years: the Red Wings moved exclusively to Fox Sports Detroit for the 2003–04 season, the Pistons moved to WDWB for the 2004–05 season after that station offered additional airtime for games, and the Tigers moved to Fox Sports Detroit outright for the 2005 season when CBS management failed to reach an agreement with the team. Lions preseason games returned to WKBD in 2004 as part of a deal that saw the team's weekly pregame show move to WWJ; WWJ took over the preseason rights in 2008.

=== First CW affiliation (2006–2023) ===
On January 24, 2006, CBS Corporation (created after the split of Viacom in December 2005) and the Warner Bros. unit of Time Warner announced that the two companies would shut down UPN and The WB and combine the networks' respective programming to create a new "fifth" network called The CW. The day of the announcement, it was revealed that 11 of CBS Corporation's 15 UPN affiliates, including WKBD-TV, signed 10-year affiliation contracts with The CW. The former WB affiliate, WDWB, signed up with MyNetworkTV under the WMYD call sign.

The station resumed having a local news presence with the debut of First Forecast Mornings, an extension of WWJ's existing morning newscast, on February 7, 2011, co-anchored by Syma Chowdhry. First Forecast Mornings was canceled on December 28, 2012, due to low viewership.

WKBD-TV began broadcasting a digital signal on December 4, 2000. The station shut down its analog signal, over UHF channel 50, on June 12, 2009, as part of the federally mandated transition from analog to digital broadcasts. The station's digital signal continued to broadcast on its pre-transition UHF channel 14, using virtual channel 50. In 2019, the station was repacked from channel 14 to channel 34 as a result of the 2016 United States wireless spectrum auction.

On December 4, 2019, Viacom and CBS Corporation re-merged to form ViacomCBS, now Paramount Global. WKBD restored a 10 p.m. newscast on January 22, 2020, produced by KTVT in Fort Worth, Texas, and the CBSN Local streaming service as part of an expansion of news programming on CBS-owned CW and independent stations; these included reports from multimedia journalists based in Detroit. On December 14, 2021, ViacomCBS announced the creation of CBS News Detroit, a full-scale news department for the rebranded "CBS News Local", with newscasts simulcast over WWJ and WKBD. Paul Pytlowany, with WKBD since 1988 and the station's director of local production and community affairs since 2017, was named the founding news director. Prior to CBS News Detroit's launch on January 23, 2023, WKBD's KTVT-produced 10 p.m. newscast was relaunched as Detroit Now News in July 2022, a hybrid national/local newscast also produced from KTVT with content reported by CBS News Detroit staff.

=== Dropping, then reinstating, The CW (2023–present) ===
WKBD logo from 2023 to 2024, when the station operated as an independent

On October 3, 2022, Nexstar Media Group acquired majority ownership of The CW. Under the agreement, CBS was given the right to pull its affiliations from WKBD and its seven other CW stations; CBS formally exercised that right on May 5, 2023, with WKBD becoming an independent station at the end of August. As part of the changes, WKBD-TV rebranded as "Detroit 50" and Detroit Now News was dropped from the schedule.

As part of a larger agreement reached between CBS and Nexstar on July 30, 2024, WKBD agreed to again carry CW programming on September 1. This came after Mission Broadcasting, a Nexstar affiliate company, failed to purchase WADL—which Nexstar intended to be the permanent replacement CW affiliate in Detroit—and WADL owner Kevin Adell terminated the station's CW contract after two months. WMYD served as the Detroit CW affiliate for the interregnum between November 2023 and September 2024.

== Subchannels ==
The station's signal is multiplexed:

Subchannels of WKBD-TV
Subchannel	Res.	Short name	Programming
50.1	1080i	WKBD-HD	The CW
50.2	480i	Comet	Comet
50.3	480i	Charge	Charge!
50.4	480i	Roar	Roar
50.5	480i	Nosey	Nosey
50.6	480i	QVC	QVC
50.7	480i	MeTVToo	MeTV Toons

== See also ==
- Media in Detroit
