= WWJ-TV =

Television station in Detroit

- Detroit, Michigan; United States
- Channels: Digital: 21 (UHF); Virtual: 62
- Branding: CBS Detroit; CBS News Detroit

Programming
- Affiliations: 62.1: CBS; for others, see § Subchannels

Ownership
- Owner: CBS Television Stations; (CBS Broadcasting Inc.)
- Sister stations: WKBD-TV

History
- First air date: September 29, 1975
- Former call signs: WGPR-TV (1975–1995)
- Former channel numbers: Analog: 62 (UHF, 1975–2009); Digital: 44 (UHF, 1999–2020)
- Former affiliations: Independent (1975–1994)
- Call sign meaning: derived from former sister station WWJ radio

Technical information
- Licensing authority: FCC
- Facility ID: 72123
- ERP: 380 kW
- HAAT: 326.7 m (1,072 ft)
- Transmitter coordinates: 42°26′52.5″N 83°10′23.1″W

Links
- Public license information: Public file; LMS
- Website: www.cbsnews.com/detroit/

WWJ-TV (channel 62), branded as CBS Detroit, is a television station in Detroit, Michigan, United States. It is owned and operated by the CBS television network through its CBS Television Stations division, and is sister to WKBD-TV (channel 50), an affiliate of The CW. The two stations share studios on Eleven Mile Road in the Detroit suburb of Southfield; WWJ-TV's transmitter is located in Oak Park, Michigan.

Founded as WGPR-TV in 1975 by William V. Banks and the International Free and Accepted Modern Masons as an extension of WGPR (107.5 FM), channel 62 in Detroit was the first Black-owned television station in the continental United States. Though its ambitious early programming plans catering to the Black community were not entirely successful due to economic and financial limitations, the station still produced several locally notable shows and housed a fully-staffed news department. WGPR-TV helped launch the careers of multiple local and national Black television hosts and executives, including Pat Harvey, Shaun Robinson, Sharon Dahlonega Bush, and Amyre Makupson. The original studios for WGPR-TV, still in use by the radio station, have been preserved as the William V. Banks Broadcast Museum & Media Center and recognized as a historical landmark with inclusion in the National Register of Historic Places.

In 1994, when a major affiliation switch threatened to leave CBS without an affiliate in the Detroit market after multiple failures to secure a more successful station, the network bought WGPR-TV and dropped all existing programming in favor of CBS and syndicated programs, changing the call sign to WWJ-TV the following year. The station has made multiple unsuccessful attempts at producing local newscasts since becoming CBS-owned, and was regarded as little more than a "relay transmitter" for network programming despite technical upgrades and a 2000 merger into then-UPN affiliate WKBD. From assuming the affiliation in 1994 until 2001, from 2002 to 2009 and again from 2012 until 2023, WWJ-TV was the only station directly owned by any of the "Big Three" networks not to have any significant local news presence. A full news department, known as CBS News Detroit, began operation in January 2023 as an extension of CBS News's streaming service.

== Prior use of channel 62 in Detroit ==
On September 15, 1968, WXON-TV began broadcasting on channel 62. Licensed to nearby Walled Lake, Michigan, WXON-TV operated on channel 62 for four years. In 1970, it purchased the construction permit of WJMY, a channel 20 station that was built out but which its owner, United Broadcasting, had no financial resources to operate, for $413,000 in United's expenses related to the permit. Land mobile interests pushed back against the sale, seeking that channel 20 be reassigned for their use in metro Detroit. The Federal Communications Commission (FCC) approved the move in June 1972, and WXON moved from channel 62 to channel 20, using the former WJMY construction permit, on December 9, 1972.

== WGPR-TV ==
=== Built by Masons ===
We don't believe anybody else can do as well presenting black culture as we ourselves.

— William V. Banks

The move of WXON-TV from channel 62 to channel 20 left the former available for assignment again in Detroit. On October 10, 1972, less than two months before WXON vacated the channel, W.G.P.R., Inc., the owner of WGPR (107.5 FM), applied to the FCC for a new construction permit on channel 62. On May 31, 1973, the FCC approved the application. What made this action noteworthy was the nature of WGPR: it was owned by the International Free and Accepted Modern Masons, loosely tied to Freemasonry with an exclusive Black membership. Founded in 1950 by Dr. William V. Banks in Canton, Ohio, the Masons boasted 350,000 members a quarter-century later. Purchased by the Masons in 1964, WGPR-FM was one of three Black-owned radio stations in Metro Detroit, and one of four that directly programmed to the Black community; it was lower-rated and placed a heavy emphasis on gospel music and religious fare, particularly on Sundays. However, it was still seen as valuable; the Masons rebuffed an offer of $1.5 million for WGPR-FM in 1973 (equivalent to $10,878,936 in 2025).

WGPR-TV thus became the first Black-owned television station in the mainland United States, as the two television stations in the U.S. Virgin Islands, WSVI and WBNB-TV, were Black-owned. Banks promised a schedule of mostly locally produced programs and news focusing on items of interest to Detroit's Black community, telling Jet, a nationally known weekly magazine aimed at the Black community, that the station "will provide in-depth penetration into the problems, goals, aspirations and achievements of Blacks and related ethnic groups". The pursuit of a television station wholly owned and operated by Blacks was seen as particularly important given high television usage in the community; a 1975 Cablelines survey found Black people watched television at an average of 30 hours a week compared to 21 hours a week for Whites, while Black children watched television for seven hours every day. Meanwhile, Banks's pursuit of a television station also had connections with the prior channel 62 in Detroit: Banks had analyzed purchasing WXON-TV, which was for sale for $1 million, but the Ford Foundation and four Detroit banks denied him financing. Following this, an attempt was made to acquire WJMY, which instead was sold to WXON-TV for them to move from channel 62 to channel 20.

The construction process took nearly two years, in part because lenders were unwilling to loan money to finance the station's start-up. However, work accelerated in 1975 as the Masons sold real estate holdings elsewhere to finance operations. A former industrial office building at 3146 East Jefferson Avenue was purchased to house WGPR radio and television, while federal government support expedited the purchase of steel necessary to erect a new transmitter facility. Broadcasting began at noon on September 29, 1975, with recorded greetings from President Gerald R. Ford and Senator Robert P. Griffin. Ford said in his address, "WGPR will serve as a symbol of successful Black enterprise. This is truly a landmark, not only for the broadcasting industry but for American society... I only wish I could be with you in person as WGPR goes on the air." Banks credited President Ford for helping remove bureaucratic red tape for the Masons and overriding existing directives from The Pentagon for the steel purchase. The Detroit Free Press hailed the station's sign-on in an October 3, 1975, editorial as "a new dimension and added stature to the area's entire telecommunications industry".

=== Signing on with a local focus ===
(Detroit) is a city of 1.4 million people, more than half of whom are Black. Yet, if you watch the other stations, you find that the programming is only about one or two percent Black. We felt that there was room for another station, one that speaks to a Black audience.

— James Panagos, WGPR-TV vice president

Channel 62 debuted in a television environment with a dearth of Black talent and programming. This was most acute in the areas of syndicated shows and advertising. James Panagos, WGPR-TV's vice president of sales, was unable to hire a Black ad salesman, so he set up a school to train TV sales professionals. Some White employees were hired with the stipulation that they train Black employees in their fields. Despite a national recession, WGPR-TV was able to secure $125,000 in advertising commitments from national companies including the major automakers and department stores Sears and Kmart, enabling them to cover all operating costs for the first year; an additional $300,000 was raised within the station's first 40 days on-air.

I remember when I told my [parents] I wanted to go into journalism, but they had other ideas. They were used to women being in positions of... being a nurse, a very honorable profession, or a teacher, which is what my mother was. I told my father a broadcast journalist, he looked at me strangely, and said, 'well Pat I don't know about that. I mean, you don't look anything like Walter Cronkite...'

— Pat Harvey

Little programming fulfilling the station's promise was available to the station in the syndication market, with reruns of the Bill Cosby drama I Spy being the highest-profile show, and the only one on WGPR-TV that starred a Black actor. I Spy, Rawhide, and Up and Coming were aired as management felt the shows treated Black people respectfully and acceptably. Consequently, channel 62 leaned heavily on local program production, much of it created from scratch by the station. Proposed programs, not all of which were eventually produced, included a soap opera, A Time to Live, set at a bar; a live morning show with a studio audience, The Morning Party; and a children's show, The Candy Store, alongside other public service programming. Local production would account for 90 percent of WGPR-TV's entire schedule, an amount unheard of for the market's larger and more established stations. Vice president of programming George White, who joined WGPR-FM in 1970 as program director, boasted that WGPR-TV would "operate as a complete production house". Bill Humphries hosted Speaking of Sports, which focused on local athletics and high school sports. Conrad Patrick, one of the station's 15 White employees on a staff of 48, had planned to host a game show named Countdown, which never aired. Additional syndicated offerings like The Abbott and Costello Show, Get Smart, Felix the Cat, and assorted B-movies comprised the remainder of the schedule. Prior to launch, one distribution company in Puerto Rico was interested in syndicating A Time to Live and The Scene internationally to Argentina and the Caribbean. Several Black-focused public affairs shows—including Black on Black, which WGPR-TV and WEWS-TV jointly produced—and James Brown's syndicated variety series Future Shock were also carried.

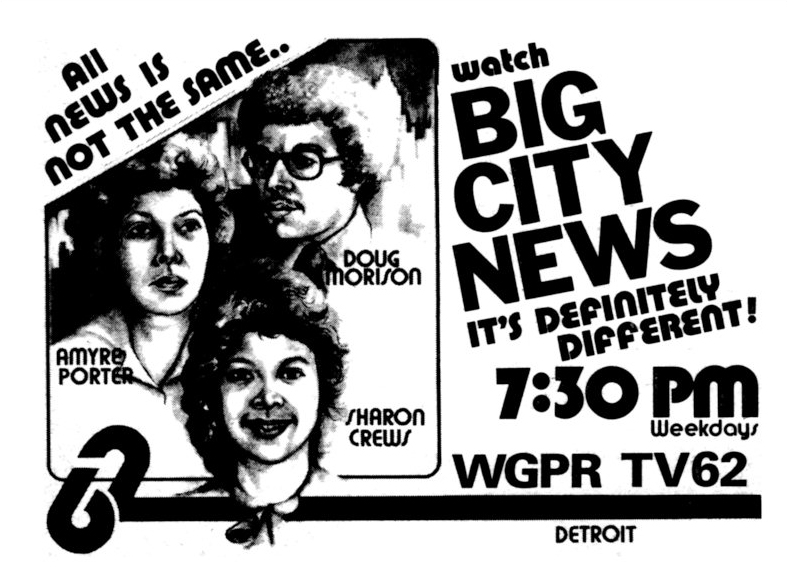
Amyre (Porter) Makupson, Doug Morison and Sharon Crews presented WGPR-TV's nightly Big City News in 1976.

One show, the live dance music program The Scene, drew on the success of WGPR radio and was among its most successful; cars would sometimes clog Jefferson Avenue to see the stars arrive for tapings. Scene co-host Nat Morris was originally hired in 1972 for WGPR-FM and was simply given directions to play music on the program as if he were a disc jockey, with the cameras focusing on the dancers throughout. Often compared to American Bandstand and Soul Train, the program inspired multiple locally popular dance moves during competitions. A full-time talent coordinator was responsible for fielding mail-in requests for prospective on-stage dancers and booking singers and musical acts. James Brown, The Gap Band, The Time and Jermaine Jackson were among the program's most notable musical guests. Prince, then a part of The Time, had also been heavily promoted on WGPR-FM; he and the band gave the stations several gold records. When Nat Morris took time off for a vacation, Panagos tapped Pat Harvey, who joined WGPR-TV in 1976 as a sales assistant, to be Morris's fill-in host dubbed "The Disco Lady". In addition to being on The Scene, Harvey hosted a daily five-minute public affairs show on WGPR-FM before joining WJBK-TV (channel 2), the market's CBS affiliate, in their community affairs department. Harvey later found greater success as a news anchor for Chicago's WGN-TV and Los Angeles's KCAL-TV, becoming the highest-paid Black news anchor in the country in 1995 at the latter station after signing a multi-year $1 million contract. Another early show, Rolling Funk, also featured dance music but in a roller derby environment, taped at the Safari roller rink in Inkster. This program was produced independently by a Black-owned production company with aspirations for syndication.

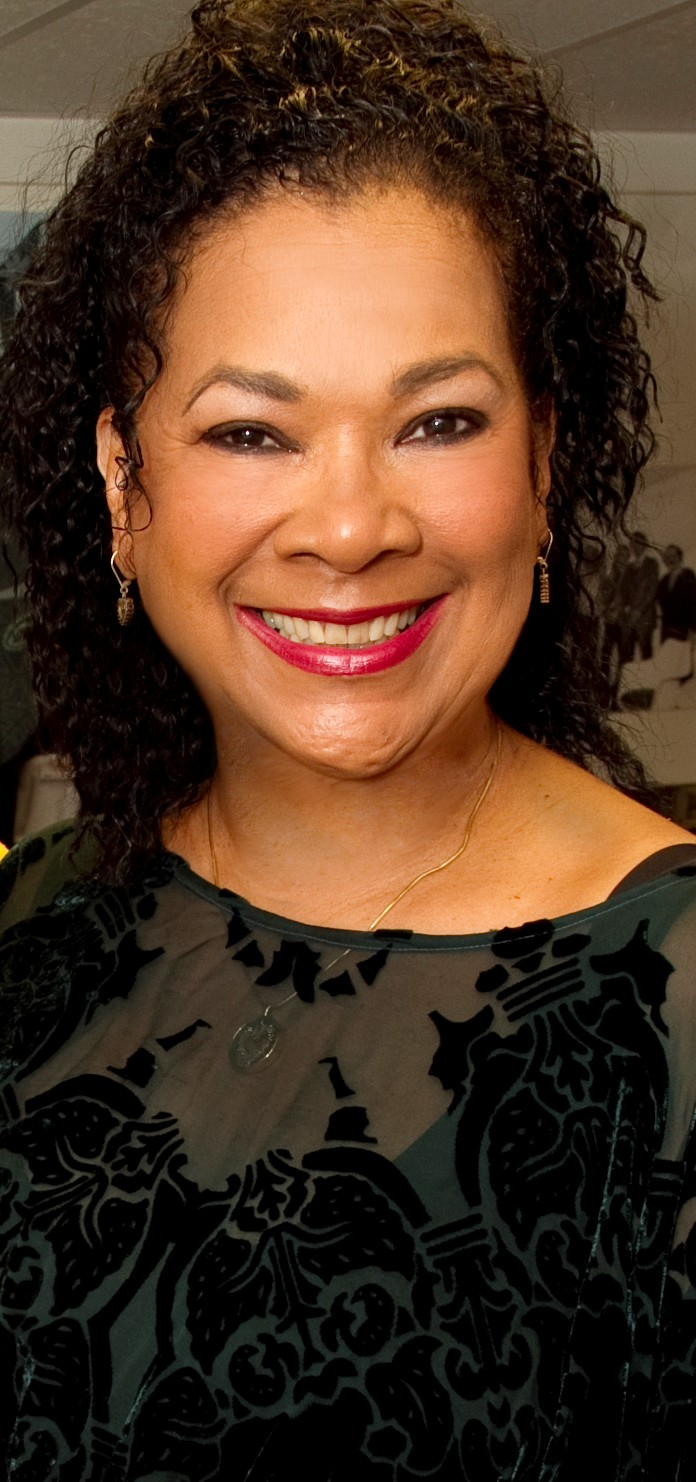
Sharon (Crews) Dahlonega Raiford Bush in 2012

The promise of WGPR-TV's news department lured Jerry Blocker away from WWJ-TV (channel 4), the city's NBC affiliate, where he had become Detroit's first Black newsman in 1967. Big City News initially aired twice a day, intending to cover topics that the three network-affiliated TV newsrooms in town did not. Big City News targeted Detroit's urban population and eschewed the suburban audience that was more interested in crime reporting that disproportionately covered Blacks: Blocker explained that "there are many stories, both negative and positive, that are not being told, and that's what we're trying to get into". Emphasis was given to positive stories about the Black community, social advocacy issues and community events. Sharon Crews was the station's first weather presenter, while Amyre Makupson (née Porter), later the host of WKBD-TV's 10 p.m. newscast, got her start at WGPR-TV's news department. Previously working in public relations, Makupson was laid off when the noon newscast she anchored was cancelled after 30 days due to lack of money, but she volunteered at the station for the next 18 months, later explaining, "you don't walk into a door without a tape... you have to get a tape from somewhere." Employees often fell into their jobs in similar ways: Ken Bryant Jr., later a producer for WKBD/WWJ-TV, had been hired as a cameraman but wound up becoming the director of the first edition of Big City News. The mere existence of a news department at WGPR-TV was credited with increasing the number of Black writers, anchors, and sources at the network-affiliated stations. Big City News was also the first television news operation in Detroit to use videotape for news-gathering purposes, eschewing film entirely.

=== Financial and technical challenges ===
After a year on the air, the fanfare and some of the more ambitious goals have been lost in the dust. In retrospect the station has done better than some expected—simply by surviving. But it has not lived up to all the rhetoric of those first weeks.

— Howard Rontal

The station's early months were very rough: technical failures were common; broadcast hours were cut back; and much of the programming plans were curtailed after just one month when Banks felt the station was losing too much money. Hopes of WGPR-TV making an immediate ratings impact by luring existing Black viewers from the other channels in the market—five licensed to Detroit proper and two in Windsor, Ontario—failed to materialize. Commercials, particularly from the national clients that had made pledges to WGPR-TV, either failed to play correctly or would not play at all due to poor equipment; General Motors in particular withdrew their advertising but allowed the station to keep the money. Banks's daughter, station vice president Tenicia Gregory, left a job as a college instructor to help run the station and never left, despite the early struggles. Gregory later said, "television turned out to be more than any of us thought... at the end of [1975], it was obvious that I couldn't walk away from it. It was impossible."

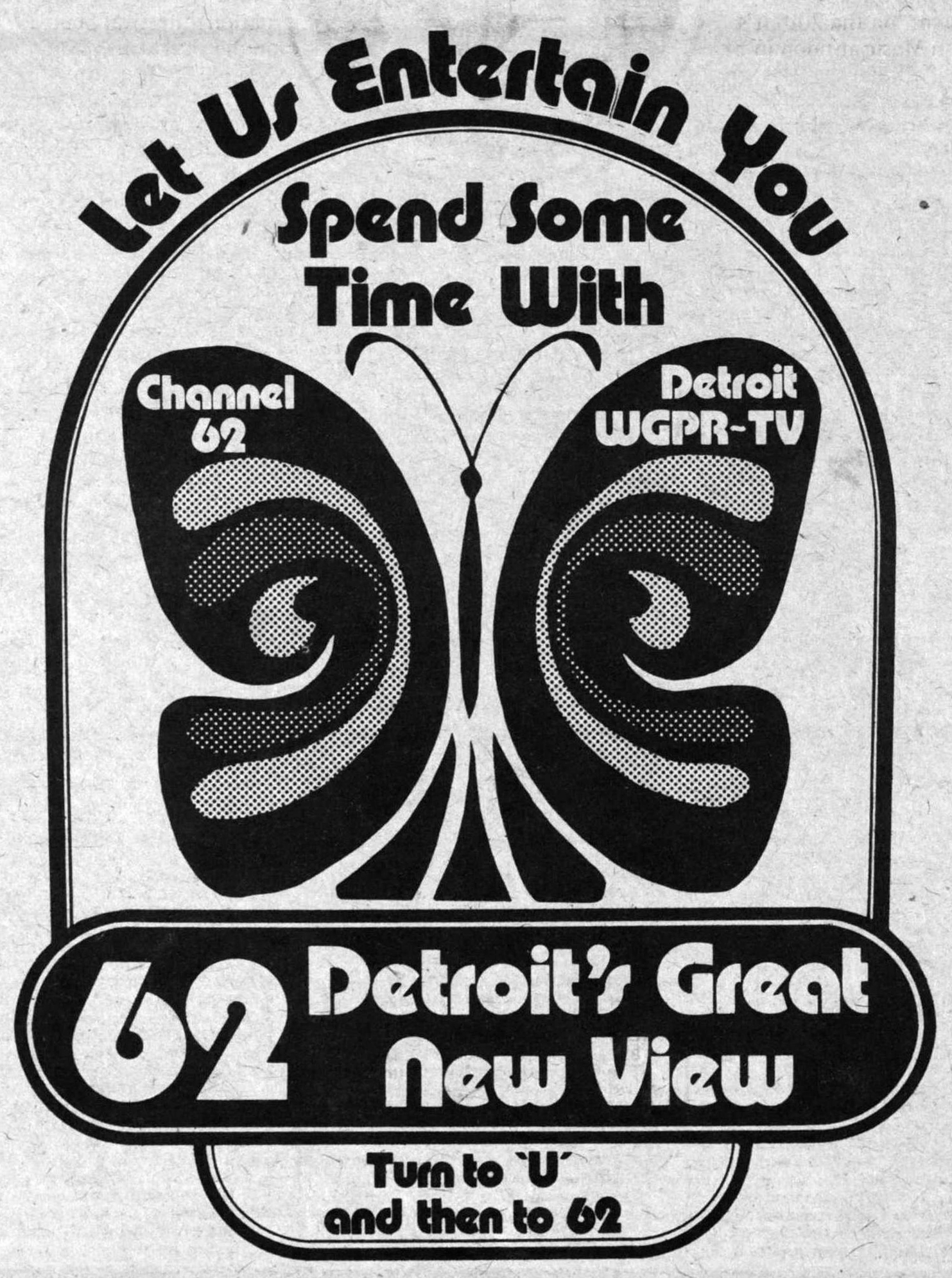
1976 WGPR-TV print advertisement showing the station's "butterfly" logo.

Where promises of 90 percent local production had once been made by Banks, that figure was 30 percent by the end of 1975. A Time to Live, the intended star program, was delayed heavily by a conflict-of-interest dispute involving its writers—both of whom were Black reporters for The Detroit News—and ultimately never aired, along with several other announced shows. Substantial downsizing and reorganizations took place at WGPR-TV: the news department was reduced from twelve people to six, and Blocker departed after less than a year on the advice of a doctor while Sharon Crews left at the end of 1976 to join WGHP-TV in North Carolina. Altogether, monthly payroll was trimmed from $35,000 to $18,000 by July 1977 alongside other austerity measures. The station had lost as much as $15,000 a week (equivalent to $89,750 in 2025) during its first year on-air amid threats of equipment repossession and closure. WGPR's transmitter was damaged following an August 1976 thunderstorm, forcing the station to be off-the-air for an entire weekend while repairs were made. Camera tube replacements for one of the two cameras The Scene used could not take place, as the $35,000 cost was deemed prohibitive, resulting in mismatched pictures from the cameras. Even the technical innovation of using videotape became a hindrance due to continuous wiping, resulting in both degraded overall quality on-air and much of the station's early years being lost.

In 1977, one station vice president, Ulysses W. Boykin, testified before the Senate Commerce Subcommittee on Communications that "there appears to have been a conspiracy in the United States that has kept the Black minority out of meaningful participation in radio and television ownership [and] has prevented those Black-owned stations from getting a fair share of the business as well as any financing". Advertising remained a primary obstacle as few White-owned businesses were willing or motivated to partner with Black-owned media, let alone channel 62, limiting the amount of local output that could be produced even further. One major problem, however, was far beyond the station's control. Detroit's decreasing overall population and concurrently growing Black population—which by 1976 was larger than the total populations of either Louisville, Kentucky, or Nashville, Tennessee—coupled with overall economic disinvestment, resulted in fewer opportunities for Black entrepreneurs. One analysis of Black capitalism in Detroit during the mid-1970s saw as many as 90 percent of Black-run businesses failing in the first five years through a combination of managerial inexperience, under-capitalization, poor locations and bankers unwilling to offer loans. Still, some ad agencies partnered with WGPR-TV despite minimal ratings: Young & Rubicam representative Judy Anderson explained, "There aren't any ratings. You've got to go by the seat of your pants... I believe in addressing the black market as much as you can."

=== Turning to religion and creativity ===
Banks was able to keep the station afloat by brokering time to religious ministries. The Masons, and Banks especially, held deep religious convictions and operated under Christian beliefs and values. When the Masons purchased WGPR-FM in 1964, Banks gave the call sign (which originally stood for "Grosse Pointe Radio") the alternate meaning of "Where God's Presence Radiates". Among the earliest national ministries that purchased airtime was The PTL Club, which became one of the station's more popular religious programs. By 1977, The PTL Club purchased 24 hours a week on the station, with the ministry paying $36,000 on a monthly basis. Various ethnic groups also purchased airtime on WGPR-TV. The Arab Voice of Detroit was a weekly Saturday night program hosted by Faisal Arabo aimed at Metro Detroit's Arab-language communities and Iraqi-American population, one of the largest of any American city. Arabo launched Arab Voice in June 1979 after having hosted a similar radio show over WJLB (1400 AM). Channel 62's other shows included Dino's Greece, Polish Panorama, and Romanian Variety; such programming had been introduced as far back as early 1976. While these shows opened up WGPR-TV to other underserved minority voices—a commitment Banks made in the station's license application—this was criticized by some for turning the station into a home for special interests and thus ignoring the Black community.

Some of the televangelists channel 62 featured were controversial. Richard Brookes hosted Faith for Miracles, which debuted in December 1977 on Sunday afternoons and eventually added two weekday programs. Brookes's on-air presence encountered scrutiny after an August 20, 1979, Detroit Free Press front-page story revealed his history of spousal abuse, adultery and violence, along with substantial unpaid debts to Canton station WJAN-TV and a Cleveland advertising agency. His program was dropped several weeks later after donations fell. Rev. Laurence J. London, who hosted a Sunday evening program, was arrested in June 1982 along with his wife by Birmingham police on charges of prostitution and solicitation. Jerry Falwell Sr.'s The Old-Time Gospel Hour was also picked up by WGPR-TV and attracted attention in 1985 when Falwell called Anglican Archbishop Desmond Tutu "a phony" for representing Blacks in South Africa and his anti-Apartheid stances. Tenicia Gregory defended the station's airing of Falwell, saying, "If we say we reject all the programming that has opinion that we do not believe in personally, we would not be able to be on the air ... to train all of the minorities we have and ... offer the public alternative programming and programming from a black perspective." One church used their paid airtime on channel 62 in a novel way: the Metropolitan Church purchased a prime time hour on WGPR-TV for $1,200 for a fundraising campaign on November 7, 1981. While only members of the congregation could participate, not all of them consistently attended, so the church reached them via television. The hour-long program raised $404,902 (equivalent to $1,433,904 in 2025).

All-night movies were also added to broaden channel 62's appeal in 1977; this made the station the first in the market to operate 24 hours a day. Ron "The Ghoul" Sweed, a local horror host, moved his Z movie/comedy show to WGPR-TV on January 6, 1978, after prior runs on WXON and WKBD-TV, but the program was quietly cancelled by June. The weekly Black Film Showcase debuted on February 3, 1979; hosted by Karen Hudson-Samuels, the program centered around feature films starring Blacks, along with profiles on the stars and a panel discussion. Detroit representative Charles Diggs hosted Diggs' Washington Forum, a panel discussion program taped from Washington, D.C., as part of the station's public service offerings. Banks offered the time slot after Diggs helped amend a treaty with the Canadian Radio-television and Telecommunications Commission (CRTC) that allowed the station to be viewable over-the-air in Canada, saying, "We feel indebted to him, so we did what we could to help him out." Gregory, who frequently referred to her father as "Dr. Banks", later reflected on his deferrals whenever she asked him for advice, instilling the importance of making decisions for herself. Nat Morris remembered Banks once insisted a newer set for The Scene was not necessary, saying "the set is not the show", prompting Morris to focus on the show in a more substantial manner.

One potential method of making money was unsuccessful. In 1979, the station sold the rights for a potential subscription television service to be broadcast over WGPR-TV to Universal Subscription Television (US-TV), an affiliate of Canadian communications company CanWest Capital Corporation. At the time, Universal was operating one subscription operation, on Boston's WQTV, and held authorizations to operate in several other areas, including Long Island, Minneapolis, and Sacramento, California. In 1981, US-TV was acquired in two parts by Satellite Television & Associated Resources of Santa Monica, California; the first acquisition included unbuilt franchises for services on WGPR-TV and KSTS in San Jose, California. However, no such pay service ever materialized, likely because Detroit already had two such operations in place. By 1983, after eight years of operation, channel 62 finally turned a profit and offered over 60 hours a week of local programming. The station also began airing assorted sporting events, starting in 1981 with Michigan State Spartans men's basketball, Major League Baseball on NBC games preempted by WDIV-TV, NBA on CBS games preempted by WJBK-TV, and Mizlou Television Network's coverage of the 1981 Astro-Bluebonnet Bowl.

=== After Banks's death ===
The idea was they could be a black entry onto the airwaves. But Channel 62 has fallen far short of what the black community hoped for in Detroit. I hope something happens to get them off dead center. There won't be any change, however, until the black community approaches management and says, 'We want change and are willing to support you.'

— Buzz Luttrell, former WXYZ-TV reporter

William V. Banks died in August 1985 at the age of 82. Banks's death triggered a brief round of dissension among the Masons, including a March 1986 lawsuit by 46 members of the lodge claiming that Ivy Banks, William's widow, had denied any information about the financial condition of the WGPR stations to them. One of the plaintiffs was George Mathews, an accountant and former Union Carbide employee from Niagara Falls, New York. During this time, the station received several unsolicited offers, most notably a bid from a company called Heart of Downtown Television headed by Lansing television station owner Joel Ferguson and including former boxer Thomas Hearns and former basketball player and future Detroit mayor Dave Bing. Analysts believed that the station would be able to pose a ratings and revenue threat to WXON and WKBD with even a minor investment in programming and equipment, noting that WKBD had been sold for $70 million two years earlier. While the February 1985 Arbitron ratings listed WGPR-TV in last place in every category, with only one percent of all television sets in the Detroit media market tuned in to channel 62, the combined profit margin for WGPR radio and television in 1984 was 31 percent, well above the National Association of Broadcasters (NAB) average of 18.8 percent for an average UHF station.

No sale materialized, and, after a judge ruled in favor of the Masons and against Ivy Banks, Mathews moved to Detroit to run WGPR-TV and improve a station that, per New York media analyst Peter Appert, was not even attempting to claim a meaningful audience share in the market. Tenicia Gregory—whom Mathews replaced as general manager—then sued Mathews, while Ivy Banks counter-sued the Masons for $1.3 million (equivalent to $3.68 million in 2025) in unpaid loans. Mathews, who had no background in broadcasting and admitted to Ebony magazine that he was relying on people who were "competent and loyal" in his new job, took over the station as the marketplace for television stations began to cool after several recent purchases were now deemed to have been at inflated prices. Consequently, Mathews declared the station was not for sale. Veteran broadcaster Don Haney predicted that the station's heavy emphasis on paid religious programming would need to change to improve from a competitive stance. By June 1987, Panagos confirmed that WGPR would add more general entertainment fare and movies to the schedule by the fall while program director Joe Spencer later admitted the station was intending "to shirk the special interest label". When The PTL Club, which WGPR-TV continued to air three times a day on weekdays, became ensnared in controversy over former host Jim Bakker, station program director Joe Spencer said no phone calls were fielded either in protest or support, while Panagos asserted WGPR-TV would not drop the program despite the ministry owing $126,945.

=== Changes and controversies ===
My mother looked at me, and I told her I was going to do television and she says, "You're strange. You're weird. What do you mean you're going to do TV?" Because when we grew up, black people were not on television that much unless they made the news. True story.

— R.J. Watkins

December 31, 1987, saw the end of one WGPR programming mainstay: The Scene was dropped from the lineup and replaced with Contempo, a similar dance music program that focused on newer music. The New Dance Show also debuted on WGPR-TV in 1988 as an informal successor to The Scene, produced and hosted by R.J. Watkins and airing at 6 p.m. weeknights. In contrast to the disco influences of The Scene, The New Dance Show focused more heavily on techno and house music, with music selections that ranged from Kraftwerk to 2 Live Crew to CeCe Peniston. Watkins, who produced both The New Dance Show and Video Request, would eventually syndicate both shows via satellite to over 40 different markets; Watkins hosted a kick-off party on April 10, 1992, at the State Theatre to celebrate the occasion, which WGPR-TV carried live. During this time, channel 62 also added several programs aimed at other specialty audiences in southeastern Michigan. In August 1986, the station started carrying the International Television Network, which was an overnight four-hour block of primarily foreign-language subtitled programs, complementing the existing locally-based ethnic fare. Telecasts of Michigan Wolverines football and Eastern Michigan Eagles football were also added. However, the station was still criticized in 1989 for persistent technical deficiencies, equipment issues and an uneven programming structure that still relied heavily on religious fare, even with promising local efforts including those from R.J. Watkins.

WGPR station ID used until the CBS switch in 1994

In 1989, John Barron wrote a story for Detroit Monthly that included watching 24 hours of channel 62's programming. He described the station's eclectic output as a "video menagerie" of specialty programs, unusual local preachers (among them Detroit area native Jack Van Impe), locally produced shows with production values "reminiscent of something you'd expect from a terrorist seeking ransom", and cheap local ads—as little as $35 (equivalent to $91 in 2025) for thirty seconds—that were "morsels for connoisseurs of the weird", summing it up as "the zeitgeist of Detroit, the entire spectrum of the city's cultural influences, its hopes, its dreams—and what it wants to sell".

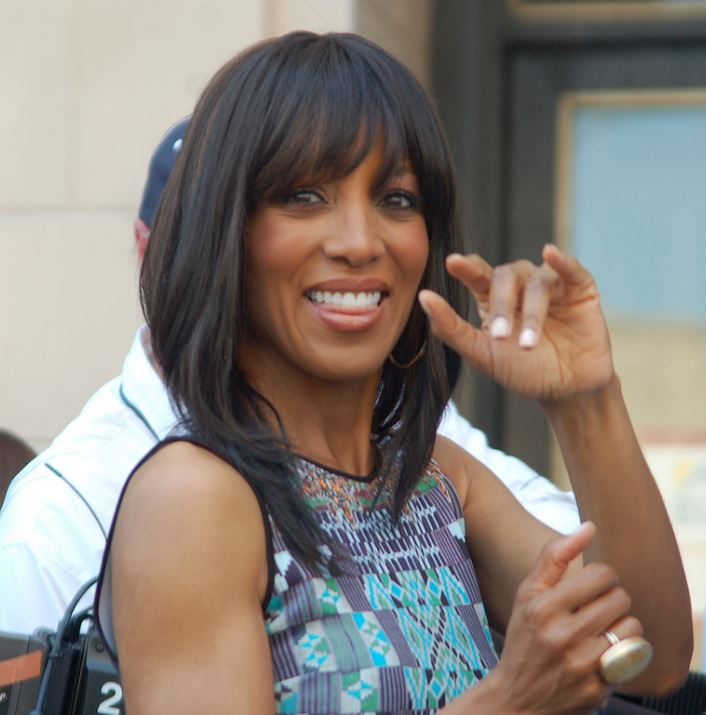
Shaun Robinson began her media career at WGPR-TV as a news reporter, anchor and talk show host.

One of WGPR-TV's local programs, the topical talk show Strictly Speaking, attracted significant community attention as the decade ended. Shaun Robinson joined channel 62 after graduating from Cass Technical High School and Spelman College; she initially appeared as a Big City News reporter but soon fronted Strictly Speaking, where one media outlet dubbed her "our own Oprah". Robinson left WGPR-TV in March 1989 to become the evening co-anchor for Flint's WEYI-TV; her replacement, Darieth (Cummings) Chisholm, boasted of wanting "to take Oprah's place" at one speaking engagement. On a 1990 edition of the program, which had Rita Clark assuming host duties, Kwame Kenyatta of the New Afrikan People's Organization made comments about what he claimed was Israel's "unholy alliance with South Africa", which resulted in the organization receiving death threats and coverage of the controversy by WWJ radio. Several months later, Faisal Arabo's Arab Voice program received unwanted attention when Arabo traveled to Iraq twice to meet Saddam Hussein in October and December 1990, the first trip resulting in the freeing of 14 hostages. Public sentiment due to the Gulf War led Anheuser-Busch to drop their sponsorship of Arab Voice, while Arabo denied his program had political leanings.

WGPR-TV also picked up some assorted network shows: it aired CBS's The Pat Sajak Show in late night when WJBK-TV declined to carry it and added the NBC soap opera Santa Barbara in 1991 after WDIV-TV dropped the program. When WJBK-TV dropped CBS This Morning to launch a local morning newscast in September 1992, WGPR-TV picked it up the following month. After must-carry rules requiring local cable systems to carry all broadcast stations in their area were struck down in 1985, WGPR-TV lost carriage on two suburban systems: a Harron Cable system on the Macomb–St. Clair county line and Grosse Pointe Cable, the latter of which dropped channel 62 in 1991 to carry C-SPAN2.

In May 1992, all but one of the non-management employees at WGPR radio and television voted to unionize with the United Auto Workers (UAW), citing unfair working conditions. One anonymous employee told The Detroit News that "if the management didn't like the way you looked, didn't like the way you said 'hello', you were gone". The UAW filed a complaint with the National Labor Relations Board (NLRB), claiming that management refused to bargain and demanded all negotiation sessions be recorded. That September, the news department was dismantled and all 11 employees laid off; management blamed the recession, but former employees claimed the layoffs were retaliation for their organizing activities; the NLRB found in favor of the workers and recommended they be granted back pay and reinstated. Mathews was reputed to run the Masons—and especially WGPR—with an "iron fist", per a December 1992 story in the Michigan Chronicle, and to give women preferential treatment. With the loss of local newscasts from the schedule, WGPR-TV continued to add more assorted off-network reruns. A lineup change in July 1993 had the station running Lou Grant, The Streets of San Francisco and Combat! in the early evening hours as counterprogramming against local newscasts and sitcoms. WGPR-TV's license renewal was briefly delayed in 1993 because it was one of seven television stations the FCC cited for failing to meet educational and informational standards in children's programming.

=== CBS comes calling ===
The station has no news and no history in the market. It's amazing.

— An anonymous CBS executive, describing WGPR-TV

On May 23, 1994, New World Communications, owner of Detroit's CBS affiliate, WJBK-TV, announced that it had reached a deal to convert WJBK and eleven other stations to Fox affiliations. The deal came after Fox outbid CBS for the rights to National Football Conference football games; New World owned a string of mostly CBS affiliates in markets that were home to NFC teams, including Detroit. As a result, CBS needed to find multiple new affiliates in each of the affected markets, but that would turn out to be far easier said than done in Detroit. Over three months, CBS explored and exhausted almost every available option to find a new affiliate or to identify a station to acquire. First, the network attempted to woo the NBC and ABC affiliates, WDIV-TV and WXYZ-TV, away from their existing alliances. It failed to do so; both NBC and ABC negotiated renewals with their stations that increased network compensation payments as much as four- to fivefold. In the case of ABC's renewal with WXYZ-TV, additional contracts were secured with stations owned by WXYZ's parent company Scripps-Howard in several other cities.

Unable to lure a VHF station, CBS's next target was WKBD-TV. On paper, channel 50 was a good fit for CBS, not least because it was the outgoing Fox affiliate and had a functioning news department. However, WKBD had been purchased the year before by Paramount Communications, which was already preparing to launch UPN in January 1995 with WKBD as a charter affiliate. Paramount reportedly turned down an offer of between $120 million and $130 million. CBS then approached WXON-TV; the network seemed more interested in an acquisition than an affiliation, according to WXON's station manager, and offered half of what channel 20's owners thought the station was worth (reported to be as high as $200 million). CBS also contacted WADL (channel 38), an independent station owned by Frank Adell, who was offered a poor deal despite his interest in CBS. Adell sought five years and compensation, in line with other deals the network was making with new affiliates, while the network merely offered him one year without any compensation payments. CBS's concern over Detroit was so great that the network also executed contingency plans; in June 1994, the network reached a deal to switch from UHF station WEYI-TV to VHF station WNEM-TV in the Saginaw–Flint area.

It's difficult to part with anything you love. But we don't have the financial capabilities to do what we'd like to here. And we take pride in the fact that we're now making it possible to bring some new jobs to the City of Detroit.

— George Mathews, on the Masons selling WGPR-TV after 19 years

In WGPR-TV, which had already been carrying CBS This Morning, CBS finally found itself a home in Detroit, but one that Mike Duffy of the Detroit Free Press branded a "last resort" for the network. On September 23, 1994, CBS announced it would purchase WGPR-TV for $24 million (equivalent to $52.1 million in 2025), operating channel 62 under a local marketing agreement until the sale was approved. The purchase brought with it the promise of 140 new jobs and an immediate push to upgrade the station's signal to achieve parity with the other network affiliates. It also spared the station from imminent removal from cable systems in Windsor, Ontario, that had planned to drop channel 62 to make way for new Canadian cable channels to be launched in early 1995. CBS's purchase made national headlines due to the network's duress, along with the station's high channel number and relative obscurity outside of the inner city: one unnamed network executive, unaware of WGPR-TV's history, told The New York Times reporter Bill Carter: "this station has no news and no history in the market".

On December 11, 1994, WGPR-TV became the new CBS affiliate in Detroit, backed by a major promotional blitz amounting to $1 million in ad spending over the first 10 weeks. The first week was marred by issues that prevented some cable subscribers from seeing the station clearly; while ratings for channel 62 rose 11,000 percent over the station's former programming on the first Sunday night, ratings for CBS dipped by 25 percent. CBS's desperate purchase of channel 62 came at the cost of WGPR-TV's existing programming inventory, which was fully displaced by new syndicated and network programs. Such shows as The New Dance Show, which had replaced The Scene as channel 62's music program after it ended in 1987, and Arab Voice of Detroit, a long-running Saturday block aimed at southeast Michigan's large Middle Eastern community, disappeared from the Detroit airwaves, as did the religious programs that had once kept it afloat. Arab Voice host Faisal Arabo was offered a 30-minute slot on Saturday mornings by the incoming CBS management free of charge, but Arabo declined the offer as he would not have been able to sell advertising to make a profit. In the case of The New Dance Show and other programs produced by R.J. Watkins's Key/Wat Productions, many moved to a new low-power station on channel 68 that started the next year which Watkins operated alongside his newly-acquired WHPR-FM (88.1).

CBS's sale application, however, met with some opposition and attempts to keep the station Black-owned. Joel Ferguson, who had been rebuffed in 1986, joined forces with Bing and Roy Roberts, an executive at General Motors, to propose operation as a Black-owned CBS affiliate. Ferguson claimed he had offered $31 million for channel 62 weeks before the Masons took the $24 million CBS bid but Mathews claimed no such offer was ever made, saying, "There was no one else in line when CBS came to us". Ferguson's group, known as Spectrum Detroit, later expanded to include other business and religious leaders in the Black community, with one pastor calling the station "sacred property". In December, the Spectrum Detroit group converted its proposal to an objection to the sale of WGPR-TV to CBS. Representative John Conyers criticized the sale, believing that channel 62 could retain existing Black-focused programming if it remained Black-owned. A Ukrainian-American man from Troy, Michigan, filed an objection claiming that a report on 60 Minutes was distorted and inaccurate, even though 60 Minutes was produced by CBS News and not WGPR-TV. In a satirical mocking of CBS's obvious desperation, Detroit News columnist Jon Pepper jokingly predicted Joel Ferguson's group still had a chance to purchase the station, in turn forcing CBS to buy a ham radio unit located in a Plymouth, Michigan, basement for $40 million.

The demise of WGPR-TV as originally envisioned was noted for marking the end of a station that had been started with a purpose but which ultimately failed to deliver. Adolph Mongo, writing in the Michigan Chronicle, asked,

What happened? How did a potentially great vehicle for Black people in the Detroit metropolitan area turn into the butt of many jokes in the media community? Programming was a joke. Technical problems were an everyday occurrence. The news department was eliminated and employees were treated worse than field hands working on a big plantation. Despite all those problems, the station had almost 20 years to become a sense of pride for the citizens of Detroit. Yet it never happened.

=== Legacy of WGPR-TV ===
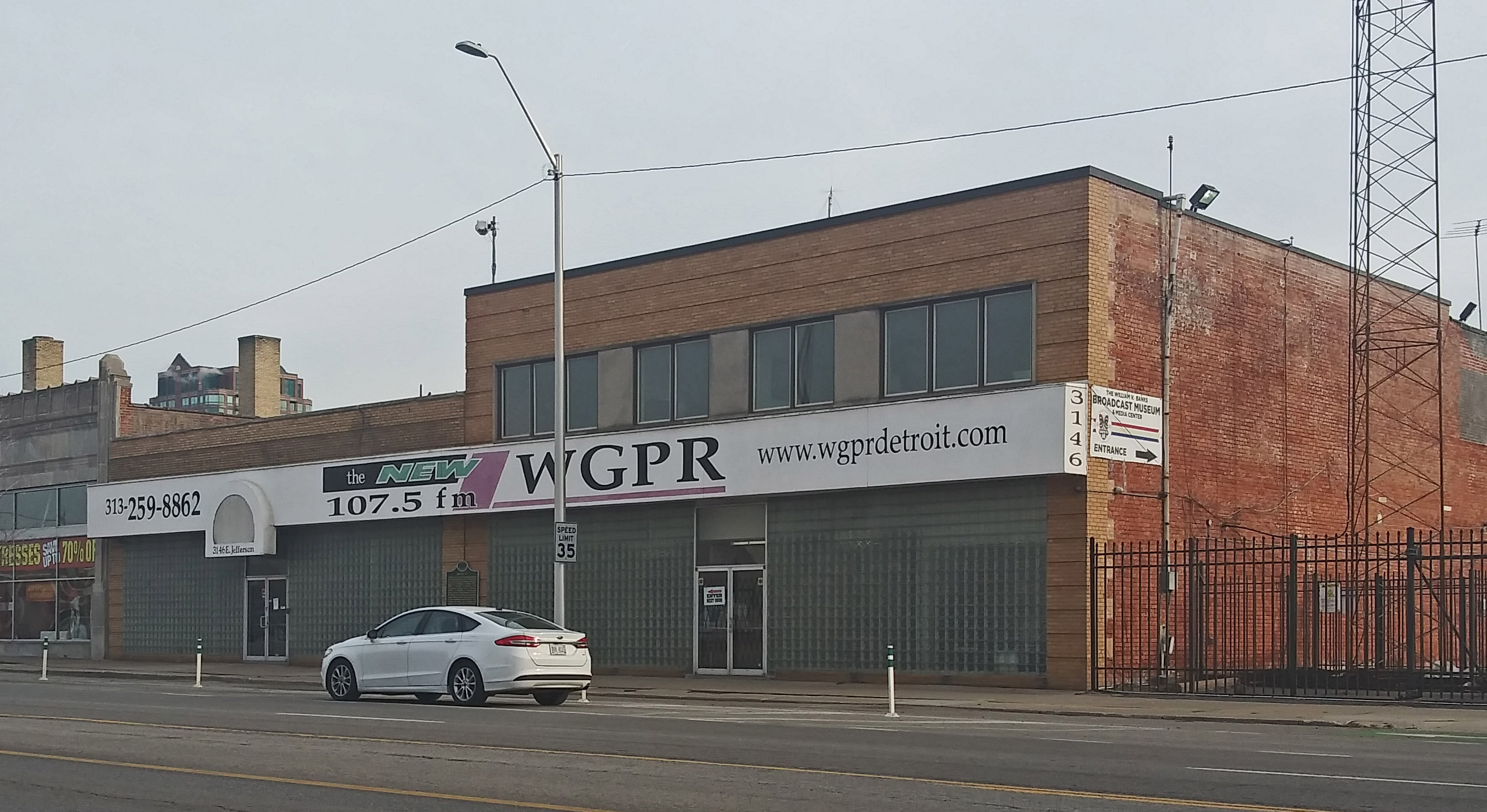
The William V. Banks Broadcast Museum & Media Center, the former WGPR studio, is today a National Register–listed museum.

WGPR-TV has been associated with the early careers of several television and media professionals, including Amyre Makupson, Sharon Crews, Pat Harvey, Shaun Robinson, and current ESPN executive David Roberts

CBS's purchase of channel 62 portended changes in FCC policy, particularly the repeal of a tax incentive program meant to encourage minority ownership and the Telecommunications Act of 1996, which removed and relaxed ownership caps. Nineteen television stations were owned by African-Americans in 1994, a number that decreased to two in 2016 but went back to 12 in 2017, with four distinct owners holding those 12 stations. Byron Allen, a Detroit native, owned or operated over 30 television stations as of 2023 via his Entertainment Studios holdings, which were purchased between 2019 and 2021 but came mostly as the result of divestitures from much larger mergers and acquisitions. The Washington Post contributor Kristal Brent Zook has criticized the FCC for failing to come up with alternative strategies to help current and prospective minority owners burdened two-fold by both media consolidation and historical discrimination.

You start losing people, and you lose the history. It's a story that needs to be told. Without Karen [Hudson-Samuels] and Joe [Spencer], [the museum] would never have happened. They're the Esther Gordy Edwards of Motown.

— Amyre Makupson

WGPR's place in history has been preserved by organizations and former employees. Makupson, Spencer, former news director Karen Hudson-Samuels, The Scene host Nat Morris and former cameraman/director Bruce Harper co-founded the WGPR-TV Historical Society in 2011 during an informal reunion, with Samuels serving as executive director and Spencer as spokesman. Plans were made by the group to create a museum for the television station at the former studios, which remain the home of WGPR-FM, still under Mason ownership. Spencer referred to the station as "a trailblazer in many ways" while Samuels, who was also one of the station's first interns, said of the effort, "We thought if we didn't tell the story, who would?"

In 2016, the Detroit Historical Museum opened a temporary exhibit detailing the history of WGPR-TV with artifacts from both the TV and radio stations. The former studios, renamed the William V. Banks Broadcast Museum in honor of WGPR-TV's founder, opened to the public on Martin Luther King Jr. Day, January 16, 2017. The building itself was listed on the National Register of Historic Places in 2021, announced on February 1, 2021, the start of Black History Month. An NRHP plaque was affixed to the building's front entrance above the Michigan History Center's historical marker, which was unveiled in 2016. The achievement turned somber when Karen Hudson-Samuels died on February 9, 2021, eight days after the studios were listed on the National Register; Samuels was remembered as a pioneering journalist and mentor who worked to preserve much of Detroit's Black history. ESPN personality Stephen A. Smith, a protégé of David Roberts, co-hosted First Take from the museum on September 9, 2022. Roberts said of Smith's visit, "It underscores the importance of never forgetting where you started; [Spencer] is the man who hired me back in 1978 and so it's my responsibility to make sure I do what I can to never forget where I came from."

Everything starts somewhere and when it comes to things that are owned and operated by African-Americans, this is where it started... WGPR is not just about on-air talent, they produced producers and directors, people that are behind the cameras, making decisions about who should be in front of the cameras and the kind of content that should be put out to our communities.

— Stephen A. Smith

Three hundred surviving episodes of The Scene were rebroadcast starting in January 1995 via Detroit-area cable-access television alongside repeats of The New Dance Show. Nat Morris has frequently made public appearances over the years embracing the legacy of The Scene, with one cast reunion in 2017 intentionally falling on his 70th birthday, quipping, "I didn't want to throw two parties." Another reunion of dancers from both The Scene and The New Dance Show took place during the Detroit Cultural Center's 2021 Dlectricity festival, with Morris as emcee. When noting the lasting influence The Scene has had in the community, Morris said, "We captured a period of Detroit... We were captured at our finest."

In 2021, Bruiser Brigade, a Detroit hip-hop collective led by Danny Brown, released an album titled TV62. The album directly references WGPR, with the station's historic butterfly logo featured on the cover. Jade Gomez of Paste noted that the album "feels like flipping through television channels" and "submerges" the audience "into their own playful public access show".

== WWJ-TV ==
=== New name, new power, but no news ===
There are some places where we're going into markets where there are literally no news department and the channel position is like almost triple digits. Where that's happening, we're obviously going to take a hit.

— Andrew Heyward, CBS News vice president, on potential rating declines for the CBS Evening News

Even with the objections filed against the sale, CBS committed to relaunching channel 62 as a CBS owned-and-operated station and appointed network vice president Jay Newman to help guide the launch. The network's $1 million promotional blitz centered around re-branding WGPR-TV as "CBS Detroit" and "62 CBS", downplaying the call sign entirely. Included in the campaign were some CBS personalities—including Murphy Brown star Candice Bergen—making fun of the high channel position, with Bergen saying in one ad, "I'm thinking of a really big number." CBS executive vice president George Schweitzer said of the campaign, "we've taken the potential disadvantage of being on a high number and turned it into a point of difference." Joe Spencer was retained as program director during this transition and was tasked with setting up a new schedule as a CBS outlet. As WGPR-TV had no news presence for nearly three years, the early evening hours included The Jane Whitney Show and A Current Affair as lead-ins to the CBS Evening News, while Late Show with David Letterman had a start time of 11 p.m. as opposed to the network time slot of 11:35 p.m. Network executives, including CBS News vice president Andrew Heyward, were especially concerned over the CBS Evening News, already struggling in ratings locally against World News Tonight and NBC Nightly News, not having a local lead-in of any sort.

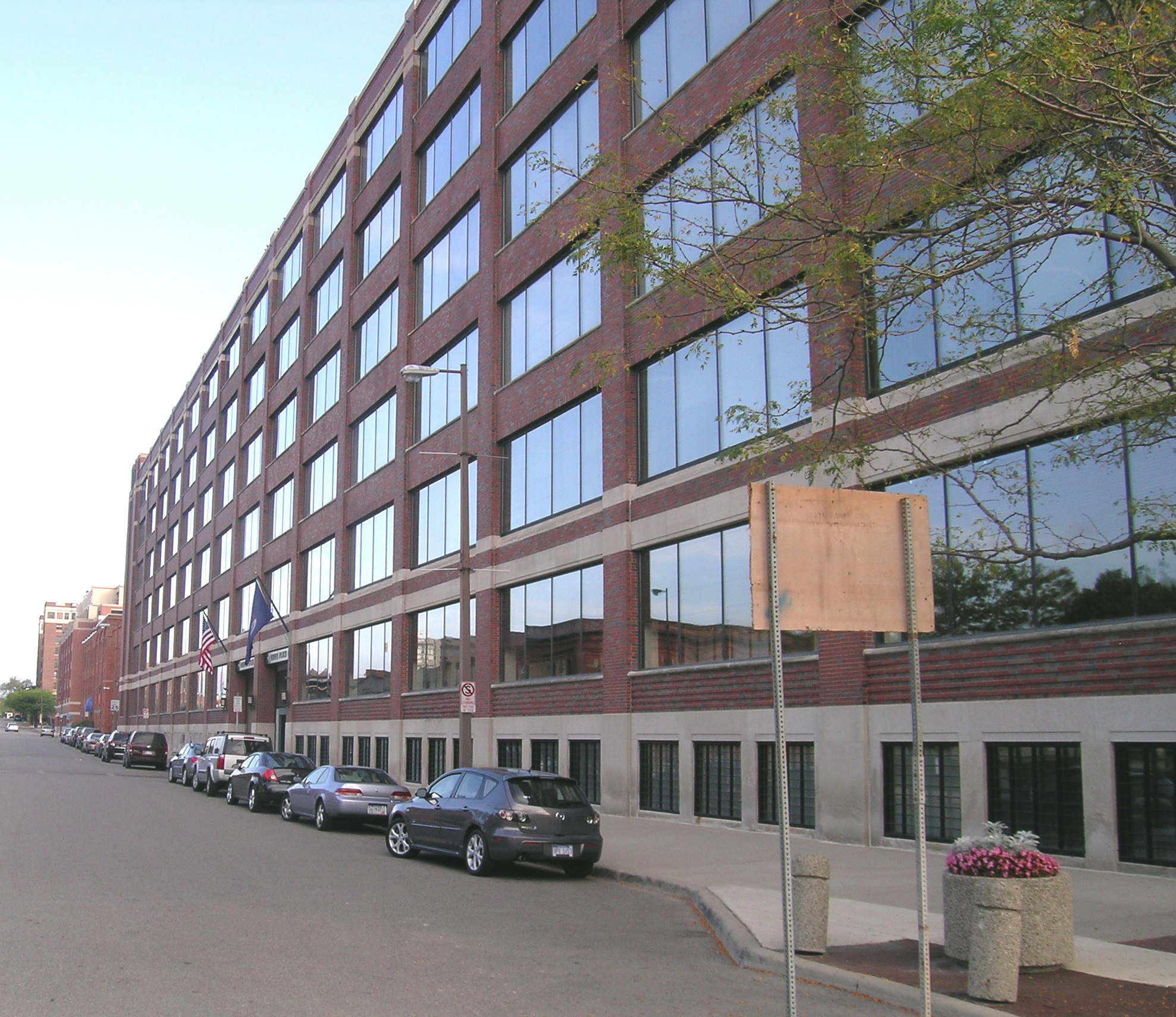
CBS moved channel 62's operations after taking over the station to an office building in the River Place development.

Industry analysts felt the purchase and relaunch of channel 62, while CBS's worst-case scenario, was the best-case scenario for Detroit. W. B. Doner & Co. executive Harvey Rabinowitz was encouraged that CBS needed to invest millions of dollars into building what amounted to a brand-new television station. CBS signed a short-term lease for office space at Stroh's River Place, moving channel 62 there, while many existing WGPR-TV staffers were kept and retrained for technical positions. Because of this, the station had to use the studio facilities of WTVS for Detroit: Making It Happen, a town hall meeting on January 31, 1995, with former WXYZ-TV anchorman Bill Bonds as moderator. Newman admitted prior to the affiliation change that WGPR-TV's relaunch as a CBS station "may be the quickest start-up operation in history, certainly in a major market". Compounding matters was viewer confusion over where certain network shows were moving to; an anonymous The Young and the Restless fan told the Free Press, "I wonder if GE makes a (TV) radio that gets channel 62", having followed the show while at work via her TV radio. As it was, initial Nielsen ratings from the week of the switch showed CBS's soap operas and Late Show remaining competitive on channel 62, but ratings for the Evening News declined precipitously from a 5 in November to a 1.8 in December.

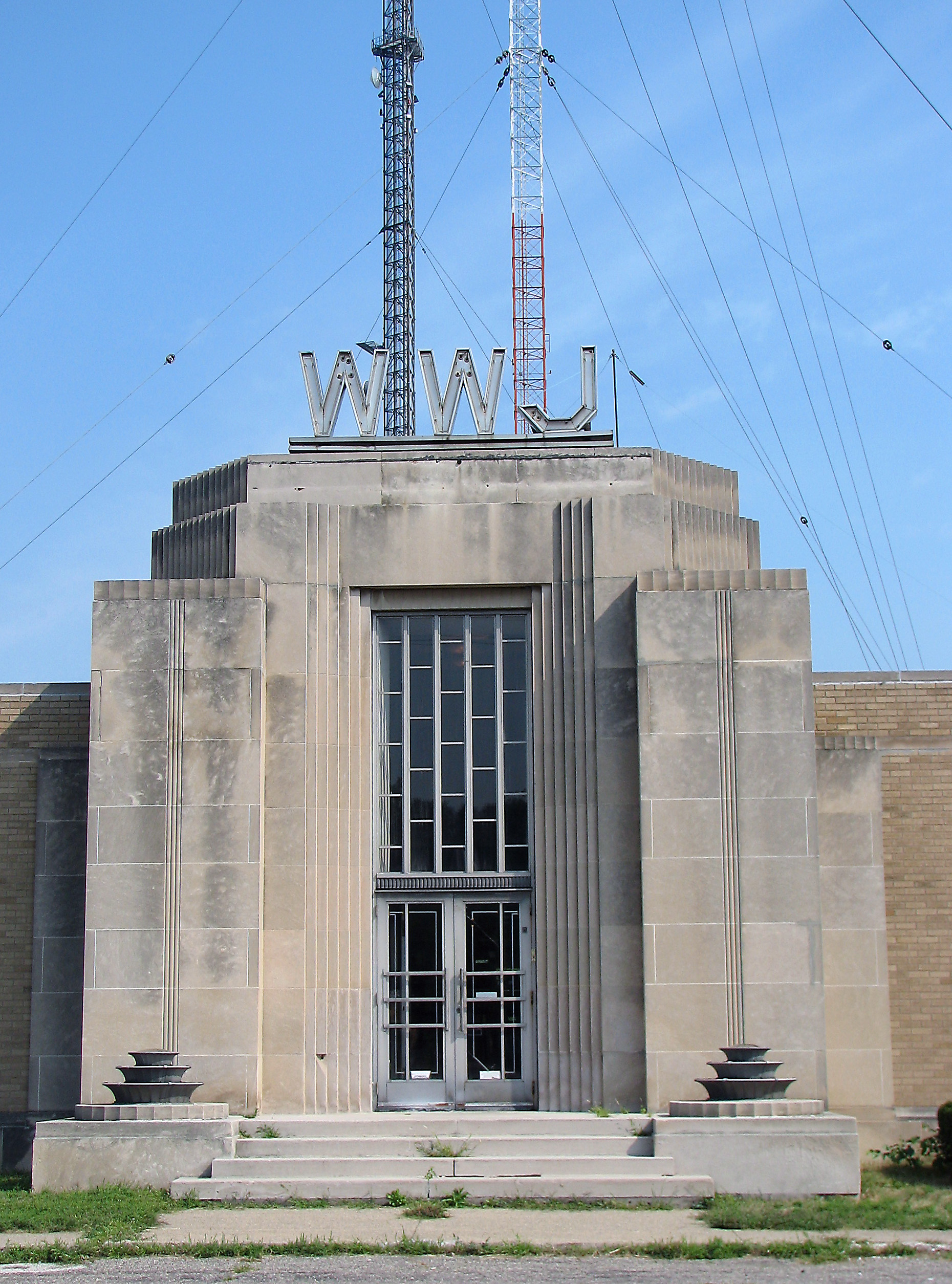
WWJ-TV's current broadcast tower was built on land that also housed WWJ radio's former transmitter building.

On July 24, 1995, the FCC denied the two objections and approved the sale of WGPR-TV to CBS, also granting it a waiver to keep its two Detroit radio stations, WWJ (950 AM) and WYST (97.1 FM), which had been owned by CBS since 1988. In denying the objections, the commission recognized that the terms of the local marketing agreement showed George Mathews still holding control over channel 62's programming, finances, and staffing for a two-year period; regarded the affiliation switch as something to which the minority-controlled license holders had agreed; and saw the sale as "in the public interest". The network immediately announced that it would expand its heretofore-temporary River Place offices and that the call letters would be changed to WWJ-TV, mimicking their AM sister. These changes occurred once the sale was consummated on September 20, 1995, returning the WWJ calls to the television dial for the first time since the original WWJ-TV (channel 4) became WDIV-TV on July 22, 1978, after it was sold off. Jay Newman was formally named as channel 62 general manager and sought to have a new facility constructed housing CBS's TV and radio properties, but declined to give a timetable, saying, "It's like buying a house; it doesn't happen right away."

CBS faced many challenges in its effort to make WWJ-TV competitive: David Poltrack, the executive vice president for planning and research for the CBS stations, called Detroit "the toughest situation for us" in the country, and CBS ratings fell 46 percent year-over-year. In the first week of the 1995–1996 television season, CBS ratings fell by half over the first week of the 1994–1995 season on WJBK-TV. The physical plant was among the largest needed improvements, and channel 62 had an inadequate signal now that it was a market-wide network affiliate. In 1997, CBS was approved to build a new 1,087-foot (331 m) transmitter site in Oak Park, 114 feet (35 m) higher than the former WGPR-TV tower in Royal Oak Township; the new facility allowed WWJ-TV to operate at the UHF maximum of five million watts, providing over-the-air coverage to Detroit's outer suburbs for the first time. The $10 million facility was activated on July 1, 1999, and also enabled the station to begin digital television broadcasts; later, the tower was also used by some of CBS's FM radio stations and the original digital transmitter for WTVS.

They can move Murder, She Wrote, revamp the entire primetime lineup and hire Leslie Moonves as entertainment chief, but there's one thing CBS can't change: Channel 62 in Detroit.

— Joe Flint, writing for Variety

In October 1995, CBS announced that it would set up a news department for WWJ-TV and had hired Steve Sabato from WLKY in Louisville, Kentucky, to serve as the news director. That April, CBS experienced the drawbacks of not having more than a bureau with one correspondent in Detroit. When federal agents investigating the Oklahoma City bombing raided a farmhouse in Decker, north of Detroit in Sanilac County, CBS was the last network to break in with a special report; CBS News had one WNEM-TV reporter live by telephone but no pictures, compared to the coverage that ABC, NBC, and CNN were able to offer using the resources of their Detroit affiliates. The station would also tap WWJ radio to produce cut-ins for air during the CBS/Group W newsmagazine Day and Date. Jay Newman was no stranger to a start-up news operation, as CBS had appointed him to manage Miami's WCIX-TV (a former Fox affiliate with a minimal news presence) in 1989; he suggested WWJ-TV should consider alternate methods of news delivery to stand out among the entrenched competition but that "are based in good journalism". By the start of 1996, however, Sabato had returned to Louisville, and news plans for channel 62 were on hold. During the late 1990s, the station's chief local programming effort was a weekly 30-minute newsmagazine, In Depth Detroit, hosted by former WDIV anchor and reporter Rich Mayk, which debuted in 1997. The station also sporadically offered other news specials and live forums, but Newman conceded that WWJ-TV was still unable to start a news operation, although the network continued to evaluate other options. Newman left WWJ-TV at the end of 1998; in April 1999, station manager Kevin Cuddihy told The Detroit News that there was a need for a different time or presentation method for a newscast but not "a need for more news". At that time, the only ABC-, CBS-, NBC-, or Fox-owned station not offering news was KDVR, the Fox station in Denver, which debuted a news department in July 2000.

=== CBS–Viacom merger and 62 CBS News ===
Viacom, the corporate parent of Paramount and owner of UPN affiliate WKBD-TV, acquired CBS in September 1999. In a number of markets, this combination created newly permitted duopolies between established CBS stations and UPN outlets. However, in Detroit, it was WKBD, the UPN station, that was larger and had a functional local news department. WWJ-TV's inability to launch a news service of its own was attributed to start-up costs that, while initially estimated at $1 million, were deemed too onerous; Detroit Free Press columnist John Smyntek criticized the station for having effectively become "a CBS relay transmitter". Even before the Viacom deal, the possibility of WKBD producing local news for channel 62 was being investigated, and a full dress rehearsal of a WWJ-TV newscast from channel 50 had been conducted. While WWJ-TV made considerably more money airing syndicated fare in lieu of local newscasts, those programs started to become more expensive to purchase and thus made cheaper local news more lucrative.

Channel 50 has actually used the same approach for three years on its 10 p.m. newscast, but nobody noticed because that hour pulls the approximate ratings of a 3 a.m. infomercial about chinchilla breeding on The Discovery Channel.

— Neal Rubin, on the "straight to the point" format of WWJ-TV's local news

Viacom appointed WKBD's general manager, Mike Dunlop, to head both stations, though only financial and technical staffs were initially combined. In February 2001, it was announced that WKBD would produce an 11 p.m. newscast for WWJ-TV, using channel 50's existing talent from its Ten O'Clock News, starting on April 2. The move was made for two reasons: the station was losing its lucrative syndicated rights to Seinfeld, previously aired at 11 p.m., to WJBK-TV, and there were ratings and advertisers that only a newscast could command. However, it was built based around the resources of WKBD-TV, which already aired Detroit's least-watched local newscast as WJBK overtook it in the ratings at 10 p.m. right after the 1994 affiliation switch. While CBS wanted either a 5 p.m. or 6 p.m. newscast launched on WWJ-TV at the same time, Dunlop declined to do so, saying, "I'd rather go up against two newscasts at first than three". As channel 62 moved into channel 50's facilities in Southfield, seven technical employees lost their jobs.

The new WWJ-TV newscast promised viewers "tonight's local news, straight to the point". In The Detroit News, Neal Rubin derided the station's approach as "closed-captioned for the intelligence impaired" and overuse of the phrases "straight facts" and "straight to the point". Smyntek noted in his Free Press column that WWJ's newscast was "essentially a repeat" of WKBD's news, "...with stories that were short—sometimes skeletal." It failed to make a ratings impression, and general manager Mike Dunlop left Viacom in August. In February 2002, Amyre Makupson and co-anchor Rich Fisher were moved exclusively to WWJ-TV's 11 p.m. newscast to allow WKBD to shift to a presentation targeting younger viewers. The newscast on channel 62 also became known as "62 CBS Eyewitness News". Despite the changes, Tom Long wrote in The News that the WKBD and WWJ newscasts could be called "the attack of the clones" for their similarity.

Low ratings, however, doomed the effort. In September 2002, rumblings surfaced that Viacom was about to pull the plug on the WKBD–WWJ news operation—the last newsroom Viacom inherited from Paramount that was still operating. These rumors were met with lukewarm responses from executives after being contacted by a Free Press reporter. Viacom then decided to contract with WXYZ-TV for a 10 p.m. newscast on channel 50, with channel 62 airing reruns of Everybody Loves Raymond at 11. The last full newscast on WWJ-TV aired on December 3, 2002.

=== "First Forecast" ===
WWJ-TV logo used from 2008 to 2012

In January 2008, the station rebranded itself as "WWJ-TV", dropping the "CBS Detroit" moniker it had been using, and reintroduced local weather updates titled "First Forecast" during The Early Show and at 11 p.m. That year, the station entered into a three-year contract with the Detroit Lions to broadcast their preseason games and in-season coaches' shows, which had been on WKBD. In 2009, the weather forecasts expanded with a new live two-hour morning program, First Forecast Mornings. News headlines on the program were provided through a partnership with the Detroit Free Press. From 2011, Syma Chowdhry, later of WXYZ-TV and News 12 New Jersey, was the program's news anchor. First Forecast Mornings ended on December 28, 2012, and was replaced with the CBS Morning News and a re-airing of Dr. Phil; a statement issued by the station read, "WWJ remains committed to local programming where it makes sense." The station's local output consisted of "Eye on Detroit" feature segments during CBS This Morning (and later CBS Mornings), the Sunday morning public affairs program Michigan Matters, and the aforementioned "First Forecast" 11 p.m. updates.

In 2017, CBS Radio agreed to merge with Entercom, which separated WWJ radio from WWJ-TV. Due to the nature of the sale, CBS retained the trademark rights to "WWJ", which was leased back to Entercom (now Audacy, Inc.) for use on the radio station under a long-term licensing agreement.

=== CBS News Detroit ===
CBS News Detroit logo

The demand now is to be able to consume content when and where viewers want it. And this is a great opportunity to do that and really offer them content that flows like water, from streaming to linear and to digital and to social platforms.

— Adrienne Roark, president, CBS Stations

On December 14, 2021, WWJ-TV/WKBD parent ViacomCBS (later renamed Paramount Global) announced it would start a full-scale news service in Detroit, CBS News Detroit, which was slated to begin in the late summer or early fall of 2022. This announcement followed prior unveiling of plans by CBS News to rebrand their over-the-top media service CBSN and localized iterations of CBSN among the entire owned-and-operated station group as the CBS News Streaming Network and "CBS News Local", respectively. WWJ-TV/WKBD vice president and general manager Brian Watson approached Wendy McMahon, co-president of CBS News and Stations, about establishing the news department; McMahon described the opportunity to start a streaming-first newsroom at a major-market, network-owned station as "unprecedented". A local newscast had previously been restored to WKBD in 2020, produced from KTVT in Fort Worth, Texas, and having been launched after the successful rollout of CBSN's localized platforms.

Uniquely for an American broadcast television station, CBS News Detroit produces 137 hours a week of online streaming news, with 40 of those hours simulcast in key time periods over WWJ-TV. Correspondents are assigned to beats organized by community, including a State Capitol reporter in Lansing; each of the 14 reporters has their own Ford Bronco equipped with mobile editing systems, allowing them to produce reports without visiting the Southfield studio. A lifted Ford F-150 serves as a mobile weather truck. The newsroom, which also serves as the news set, has an industrial design. Management emphasized that WWJ-TV would simulcast the streaming service instead of the other way around, allowing for longer reports not subject to time limits and the newscasts having a more conversational tone.

In January 2022, Paul Pytlowany, an employee of WKBD since 1988 and the director of local production and community affairs for WKBD and WWJ-TV since 2017, was named the founding news director. The initial series of on-air talent hires announced on July 11, 2022, included Amyre Makupson's daughter, also named Amyre, as executive producer of community impact, a move WWJ-TV billed as her "following in the footsteps of her mother". Veteran broadcaster Ronnie Duncan, named as the station's lead sports anchor, is the father of CBS Weekend News anchor and network correspondent Jericka Duncan.

On September 1, 2022, WWJ-TV rebranded from "CBS 62" to "CBS Detroit" in anticipation of the launch of CBS News Detroit. WKBD's newscast was also relaunched in July as Detroit Now News, a hybrid national/local newscast including CBS News Detroit content. By year's end, the launch had been delayed, owing to supply chain- and pandemic-induced delays. Weeknight newscasts at 6 and 11 p.m. launched on January 23, 2023, with additional local news in the morning, midday and afternoon hours to follow later in the first half of the year. Notably, the delay meant the station missed out on selling political advertising during the new newscasts in the run-up to state elections in November. The morning newscast premiered early on February 20, 2023, to provide coverage of the shooting at Michigan State University, before fully launching on March 6. It was co-anchored by former WDIV-TV anchor/reporter Sandra Ali and also featured extended streaming-only segments.

In March 2024, Ibrahim Samra, a 27-year-old Palestinian American former reporter for CBS News Detroit, sued CBS, alleging that he was fired after social media posts relating to the Gaza war. Samra claimed in his filing that he was prevented from covering stories in Dearborn or relating to the ongoing war and was fired after he produced a piece encouraging voters in the upcoming presidential primary to show opposition to the war. In August 2025, Samra agreed to dismiss the lawsuit and allegations.

WWJ-TV also produces the weekly panel discussion program Michigan Matters, focusing on issues relevant to metro Detroit. Airing on Sunday mornings and rebroadcast nightly on CBS News Detroit, it is hosted by Carol Cain, columnist for the Detroit Free Press; panelists have included Denise Ilitch, Bryan Barnett and L. Brooks Patterson.

== Technical information ==
=== Subchannels ===
WWJ-TV's transmitter is located in Oak Park, Michigan. The station's signal is multiplexed:

Subchannels of WWJ-TV
Subchannel	Res.	Short name	Programming
62.1	1080i	WWJ-HD	CBS
62.2	480i	StartTV	Start TV
62.3	480i	DABL	Dabl
62.4	480i	365 BLK	365BLK
62.5	480i	Story	Story Television

=== Analog-to-digital conversion ===
WWJ-TV began broadcasting a digital signal on UHF channel 44 shortly after the Oak Park tower went into service in 1999. Analog broadcasts on channel 62 ended on June 12, 2009, as part of the digital television transition. On March 13, 2020, the station relocated its signal from channel 44 to channel 21 as a result of the 2016 United States wireless spectrum auction.

In 2020, WWJ became one of five Detroit stations participating in the launch of ATSC 3.0 (Next Gen TV), provided by WMYD in the Detroit market.

== See also ==
- Media in Detroit
- List of three-letter broadcast call signs in the United States

== Bibliography ==
- Castelnero, Gordon (2006). TV Land Detroit. Ann Arbor, Michigan: University of Michigan Press. pp. 8–9, 160–178, 221. ISBN 978-0-472-03124-5.

== Documentaries ==
- Henderson, Stephen (January 8, 2017). WGPR-TV Museum | American Black Journal Clip (ep. 4514) (Television production). Detroit, Michigan: WTVS. Archived from the original on February 2, 2022.
- Henderson, Stephen (January 7, 2018). WGPR-TV Museum | American Black Journal Clip (ep. 4609) (Television production). Detroit, Michigan: WTVS. Archived from the original on February 2, 2022.
- Henderson, Stephen (February 5, 2018). WGPR | American Black Journal Clip (Television production). Detroit, Michigan: WTVS. Archived from the original on February 2, 2022.
- Henderson, Stephen (February 19, 2021). WGPR-TV | American Black Journal Clip (ep. 4908) (Television production). Detroit, Michigan: WTVS. Archived from the original on February 2, 2022.
- Kalinski, Pete (September 29, 2015). Digging Detroit: Episode 12 – WGPR TV's 40th Anniversary (YouTube). Kevin Walsh; Thomas J. Reed, Jr. Detroit, Michigan: Digging Detroit Productions. Archived from the original on February 2, 2022.
- Moore, Larry (April 5, 2017). WGPR Broadcast Museum Show (Television production). Detroit, Michigan: We Luv Detroit/WMYD. Archived from the original on February 2, 2022.
- Visit at the WGPR Museum TV & Radio Station! (YouTube). Fantabulous30. September 11, 2021. Archived from the original on February 2, 2022.
- A Little History About Black Broadcast Television Production in Detroit, Michigan, USA (YouTube). MacSpeaking. February 5, 2018. Archived from the original on February 2, 2022.
- WGPR Museum Special (YouTube). SteelHeartMedia. February 2, 2017. Archived from the original on February 2, 2022.
