= William V. Banks Broadcast Museum & Media Center =

Radio studio, former television studio, and museum located in Detroit, Michigan

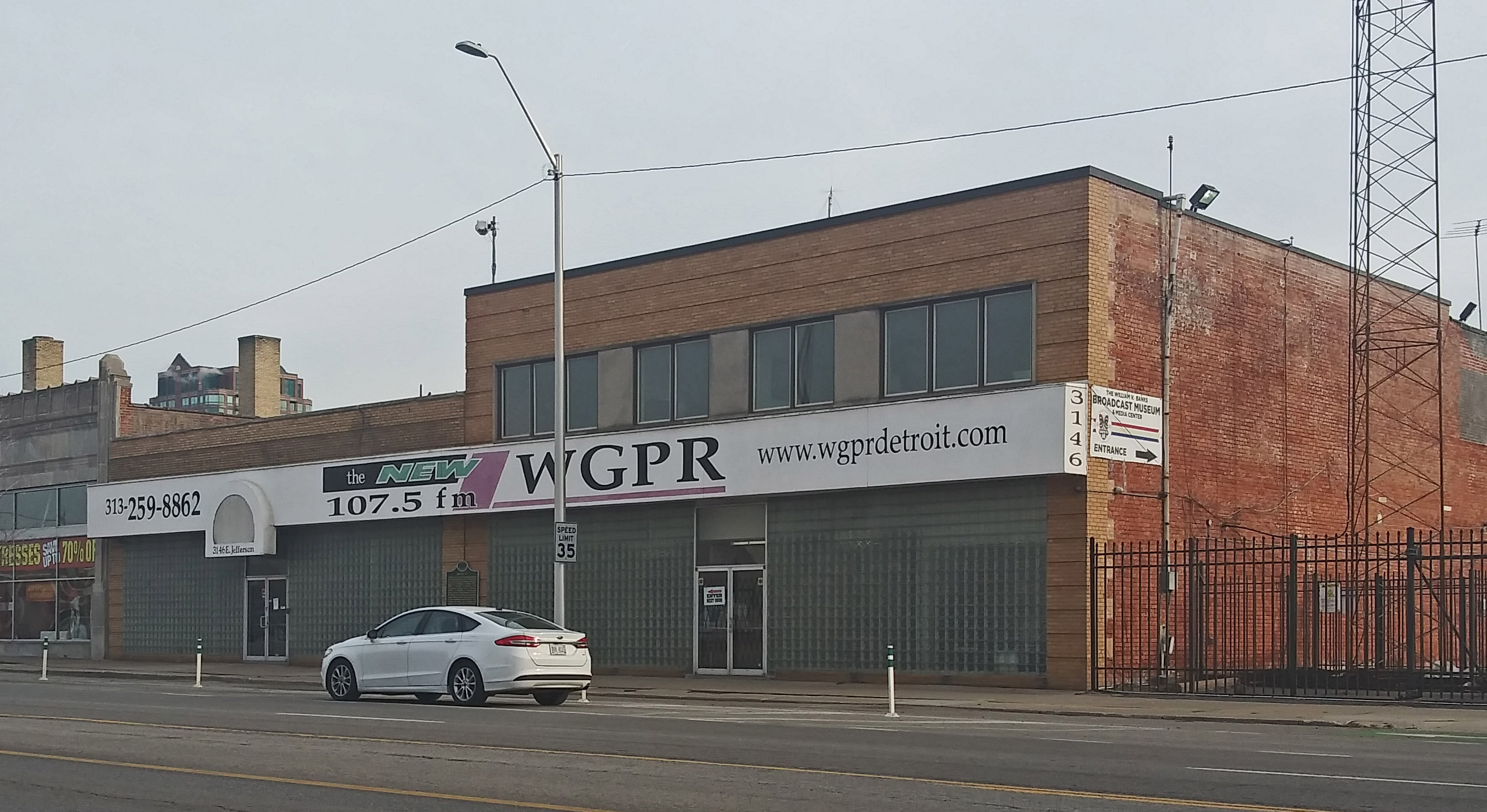
- Interactive map of the William V. Banks Broadcast Museum & Media Center area

General information
- Type: Film, radio, and television production studio Museum
- Location: 3146 E. Jefferson Avenue; Detroit, Michigan; 48207
- Coordinates: 42.3404°N 83.0169°W
- Opening: December 6, 1961 (radio studio); September 29, 1975 (television studio); January 16, 2017 (museum)
- Owner: International Free and Accepted Modern Masons

Website
- WGPR-TV/FM Studio
- U.S. National Register of Historic Places
- Location: 3146 E. Jefferson Ave.; Detroit, Michigan
- Coordinates: 42°20′25″N 83°1′1″W
- MPS: The Civil Rights Movement and the African American Experience in 20th Century Detroit MPS
- NRHP reference No.: 100006101
- Added to NRHP: January 27, 2021

The William V. Banks Broadcast Museum & Media Center, formerly known as the WGPR-TV Studios is a museum and radio broadcasting studio and former television studio located in Detroit, Michigan. The museum places special interest in the history of the WGPR-TV station, one of the first African-American-owned television stations in the continental United States. The studio is still in use for the radio station WGPR-FM and was formerly used as the studio for CBS station WWJ-TV (formerly WGPR-TV).

== History ==
=== Background ===
In 1964, William V. Banks and his organization, the International Free and Accepted Modern Masons (IFAMM), purchased the radio station WGPR. The radio station call letters originally stood for Grosse Pointe Radio, where it was originally located, but Banks altered it to Where God's Presence Radiates. By the early 1970s, the station was doing good business and Banks decided to expand into television in 1973. The new project was costly, and Banks and the IFAMM struggled to raise the necessary capital. The situation was helped by the support of FCC commissioner Benjamin Hooks and President Richard Nixon. However, it was not until 1975 that Banks secured the funds to follow through.

=== WGPR-TV studios ===
Banks and the IFAMM purchased two commercial buildings on East Jefferson Avenue to convert into a television studio. The buildings were likely constructed some time in the 1900s or 1910s, and had hosted a variety of businesses through the rest of the century. On September 28, 1975, WGPR-TV began transmission from the studios as the first African American-owned television station in the mainland United States. In October, a short-lived live dance music program titled The Scene hosted its first tapings from the studios.

The station initially struggled, but by 1977 had become profitable. It continued to be a voice for the Black Detroit community for two decades. However, by the early 1990s, it became difficult to compete with cable stations, and BET specifically. In 1994, after WJBK had announced that they were switching their affiliation to the Fox Network after News Corporation had purchased a 20% stake in the station, CBS had announced that they would be purchasing WGPR-TV for $24 million (equivalent to $52.1 million in 2025) and the station became a CBS owned-and-operated station on December 11, 1994. However, the station's call letters were changed to WWJ-TV on September 20, 1995 after the sale was finalized, the first time that the call letters were used for television since 1978. In October 1995, CBS set up a news department for the first time in the station's history and would broadcast from the studios until 2001 when the station's headquarters was moved to Southfield.

=== William V. Banks Broadcast Museum & Media Center ===
In 2017, the studio was renamed to the William V. Banks Broadcast Museum & Media Center which opened on February 16, 2017.

In 2021, the building was listed in the National Register of Historic Places, beginning on February 1, 2021, the start of Black History Month. An NRHP plaque was affixed to the building's front entrance above the Michigan History Center's historical marker, which was unveiled in 2016. On September 9, 2022, ESPN broadcast a live episode of First Take from the studios.

== Description ==
The William V. Banks Broadcast Museum & Media Center consists of two adjacent early 20th century commercial brick buildings faced with buff brick. One is a single-story structure and the other is a two-story building. A boxed canopy runs across the front of both buildings, unifying them. The original store front openings are infilled with glass block. A pair of entry doors are located in the center.
