= WGPR =

Urban radio station in Detroit

- Detroit, Michigan; United States
- Broadcast area: Metro Detroit
- Frequency: 107.5 MHz (HD Radio)
- Branding: Hot 107.5

Programming
- Format: Urban contemporary
- Subchannels: HD2: Urban oldies

Ownership
- Owner: International Free and Accepted Modern Masons; (WGPR, Inc.)

History
- First air date: December 6, 1961
- Call sign meaning: "Grosse Pointe Radio"

Technical information
- Licensing authority: FCC
- Facility ID: 70512
- Class: B
- Power: 50,000 watts
- HAAT: 123.5 meters (405 ft)
- Transmitter coordinates: 42°21′28″N 83°3′55″W

Links
- Public license information: Public file; LMS
- Webcast: Listen live
- Website: www.hot1075wgprdetroit.com

WGPR (107.5 FM) is a commercial radio station in Detroit, Michigan, broadcasting an urban contemporary radio format. Owned by the International Free and Accepted Modern Masons, its studios and offices are on East Jefferson Avenue on Detroit's lower eastside inside the William V. Banks Broadcast Museum & Media Center.

WGPR has an effective radiated power (ERP) of 50,000 watts. The station's transmitter is atop the Maccabees Building on the campus of Wayne State University, on Woodward Avenue in Detroit.

== History ==
=== Early years ===
The station signed on the air on December 6, 1961, making it the first radio station in Michigan to broadcast in stereo. It was founded by broadcaster Ross Mulholland, who had worked at WJR and several other area stations. The original construction permit for the station bore the call sign WQTI, similar to Mulholland's easy listening-formatted AM station, WQTE (560 AM, now WRDT), but the station was never on the air with those call letters. Upon signing on, the call letters were WGPR.

Initially, WGPR featured easy listening music similar to that of WQTE. The station was purchased in 1964 by the International Free and Accepted Modern Masons (d/b/a WGPR, Inc.), led by Dr. William V. Banks, who served as president and general manager of WGPR until his death in 1985.

It is reported that the station's call sign meant "Where God's Presence Radiates", but the original meaning was "Grosse Pointe Radio." The station was originally based at a studio on 20233 Mack Avenue in Grosse Pointe Woods when it went on the air. The original building still stands and houses a real estate agent. The current studios are located on East Jefferson in Detroit.

An independent television station focusing on shows aimed at African-American viewers was added in 1975, WGPR-TV. On September 29, 1975, Amyre Porter, Doug Morrison and Sharon Crews became the nation's first African-American primetime news team. WGPR-TV became a CBS network affiliate in 1994 following WJBK's switch from CBS to Fox. WGPR-TV was sold to CBS in 1995, taking the call sign WWJ-TV.

=== Urban contemporary ===
Under the ownership of the Masons, WGPR transitioned to African-American-oriented programming, including urban contemporary, R&B, soul music and urban gospel. Some brokered ethnic programs in Spanish, Italian, Greek and other languages, were on the schedule into the 1990s.

The disc jockey known as Electrifyin' Mojo was heard evenings on WGPR during the early 1980s. In 1982, during Mojo's tenure at WGPR, the station scored its highest ratings, landing in the Top 10 on several occasions. By the mid-1980s, the station had once again fallen into the lower echelons of the ratings and remained there for the next quarter-century. WGPR was, by October 2011, the lowest-rated of Detroit's three urban AC stations, trailing WMXD and WDMK. Nevertheless, the station had a devoted audience. Its ratings were not adversely affected by Detroit's switching from Arbitron's diary system to Portable People Meters (PPM).

=== Jazzy 107.5 and The Rhythm ===
Until October 2011, WGPR featured a mix of urban adult contemporary hits and urban oldies. From June 1997 to June 2008, the station was known as "The Rhythm 107-5" or "The Jazzy 107-5", and for several years, featured smooth jazz mixed in with its urban format. On June 20, 2008, the station reverted to an urban AC format.

Saturdays were "Old School Saturdays", featuring a wide variety of classic R&B, soul and dance-oriented oldies. Genres played on OSS included disco, funk, 1980s electronic music, dance music, Motown, urban oldies, and 1970s R&B. This program was prone to technical errors, including skipping CDs, varying volume levels between tracks, a song ending midway through and sometimes accidental but simultaneous mix-in of multiple song tracks. Sundays were devoted mostly to urban gospel programming. According to the September 2011 PPM Ratings release, WGPR ranked #20 (2.1) in the Detroit market.

=== Radio One LMA ===
The current urban format on WGPR began on WCHB-FM (105.9) in 1996, later changing call signs to WDTJ before swapping formats with WDMK by moving to that station's frequency on 102.7 as WHTD in 2005.

On October 21, 2011, Radio One announced that it would take over WGPR under a local marketing agreement (LMA), and move WHTD's urban contemporary format to the station as Hot 107.5. Meanwhile, WHTD was to flip to an urban gospel format as Praise 102.7 on October 31. On October 24, WGPR signed off as Radio One assumed control, and began stunting with a loop of "It's So Hard to Say Goodbye to Yesterday" by Boyz II Men. This was interspersed with promos redirecting WGPR listeners to Radio One's urban AC station WDMK (whose competition was neutralized by the format shuffle).

On October 26, 2011, WGPR re-launched as Hot 107.5. WIZF alum Big Greg (also known as Buckie Naked) was the first DJ on air, followed by future 106 & Park host Shorty Da Prince on nights and Paigion on mid-days.

The WHTD call letters did not move with the frequency shift; the call letters now belong to an AM radio station in Toccoa, Georgia. WGPR featured the syndicated Rickey Smiley morning show until October 2014, when it was replaced with The Morning Heat, a local show with Big Greg, Foolish, and Deelishis.

In the December 2013 Detroit PPM ratings report, WGPR ranked 14th 6+ among subscribing stations, with a 3.6 rating to rival WJLB's 4.2.

=== End of Urban One LMA ===
On June 10, 2019, Urban One announced that it would not renew its LMA with WGPR when it expired at the end of 2019. The same day, Beasley Broadcast Group announced that it would acquire WDMK and its Detroit Praise Network stations for $13.5 million.

WGPR is once again run by a staff employed by the Masons. It has remained a mainstream urban outlet, competing with WJLB, WMXD, WDMK and WMGC-FM.

== HD Radio ==
=== Smooth Jazz and Modern Rock ===
On April 20, 2011, WGPR launched two HD Radio digital subchannels, with a smooth jazz format on WGPR-HD2 as The Oasis and modern rock on WGPR-HD3 as The Bone. These subchannels were programmed by the Martz Communications Group. Martz owned the low-powered translators (through licensee Radio Power, Inc.) that rebroadcast the HD Radio signals: 104.7 FM W284BQ would rebroadcast The Oasis, while 94.3 FM W232CA would rebroadcast The Bone. The Oasis programming came from Broadcast Architecture's Smooth Jazz Network, featuring Kenny G as morning show host with Detroit radio veteran Sandy Kovach (formerly of the former smooth jazz outlet V98.7) as co-host. As of May 1, 2011, the station added an HD4 subchannel with Regional Mexican programming branded as La Jefa. By July of that year, the HD4 subchannel was no longer on air.

Martz's operation of WGPR's HD subchannels was not affected by the LMA agreement with Radio One. On January 31, 2012, Martz Communications ceased operations of The Oasis and The Bone, forcing them both off the air. Financial and signal difficulties were the primary reasons for the closure of the two HD subchannels.

=== The Oasis vs. WIOT Toledo ===
In March 2011, Martz filed an application with the Federal Communications Commission (FCC) to relocate the frequency of W284BQ, from 104.7 MHz to 93.9 MHz. The application was approved in August 2011. If built, the transmitter will interfere with Windsor, Ontario station CIDR-FM in much of the Greater Detroit area, though the licensee contends that the transmitter will be directional, as to not interfere with CIDR-FM on the Canadian side of the border.

In May 2011, Toledo station WIOT, which also broadcasts on 104.7 MHz, filed a complaint with the FCC, saying that W284BQ interferes with WIOT in the Michigan portion of their broadcast area. WIOT had also solicited comments and reception reports from listeners in the affected area.

Martz would soon after establish a website, http://www.savetheoasis.com/, which explains the station's position on the issue, stating that WIOT should not get special treatment on the grounds that it was an Ohio radio station that served no part of Detroit (though the statement was not exactly true, as the station was interfering with listeners inside WIOT's protected signal contour) and that Clear Channel's motive was to try to remove competition, as Clear Channel owns two of the heritage adult-oriented radio stations in Detroit, WMXD and WNIC. The Oasis' web site mentioned that they and Clear Channel planned to undergo mutual testing in order to alleviate the interference problems, but in June 2011, The Oasis claimed that Clear Channel had broken the commitment to work together for a resolution.

On October 18, 2011, the FCC ordered W284BQ to cease operation immediately. Oasis programming continued in the interim over WGPR-HD2 and 1047theoasis.com, until both the HD2 and the website were shut down. The translator filed to move to 93.5 MHz; however, a K-LOVE repeater also applied to use this frequency and was granted permission.

On January 9, 2012, Martz applied to return The Oasis to the airwaves, this time via a translator on 92.7 MHz. However, any relaunch on 92.7 was negated by Martz's suspension of operations of its Detroit HD Radio operations, as FCC regulations require the translators to repeat an existing station. The 92.7 translator has since been taken over by Salem Communications-owned talk station WDTK and is used to relay that station. Meanwhile, smooth jazz programming returned to the Detroit airwaves during the late evening and overnight hours via Radio One's WCHB 1200 AM (now WMUZ) and its FM translator.

== Sources ==
- Michiguide.com – WGPR History
