= William V. Banks =

American Mason and media executive

- Born: Williams Venoid Banks; May 6, 1903; Geneva, Kentucky, U.S.
- Died: August 24, 1985 (aged 82); Detroit, Michigan, U.S.
- Education: Wayne State University; Detroit College of Law
- Occupations: Lawyer, minister
- Years active: 1949–1985
- Spouse: Ivy Banks
- Children: 3

William Venoid Banks (May 6, 1903 – August 24, 1985) was an American lawyer, minister, founder of the International Free and Accepted Modern Masons, and the first president and general manager of WGPR-FM (which became Detroit's first black radio station) and WGPR-TV (which was the first black-owned and black-operated television station in the United States).

== Early life ==
Banks was born on May 6, 1903, in Geneva, Kentucky. His parents, Richard and Clara Banks, worked as sharecroppers, until his father was almost lynched for standing up for himself against his white employer and then the family frequently moved as his father changed jobs. Once Banks was a teenager, he worked various jobs, including at the Ford Motor Company, to send money back to his family and save for college.

== Career ==
Banks graduated from Lincoln Institute of Kentucky, now Wayne State University, in 1926 and from the Detroit College of Law in 1929. Banks enjoyed early success as a lawyer. He served as the head of the Detroit branch of the International Labor Defense, and briefly a member of the Communist Party. Banks became more involved in local politics, working for Frank Murphy's campaign for Mayor. During the Great Depression in the United States, Banks bought up numerous properties in Detroit at a fraction of their price becoming a successful real-estate investor.

After fifteen years practicing law, Banks retired from law and attended the Detroit Baptist Seminary and was ordained a minister in 1949. He also founded the Universal Barber College and the International School of Cosmetology in 1957.

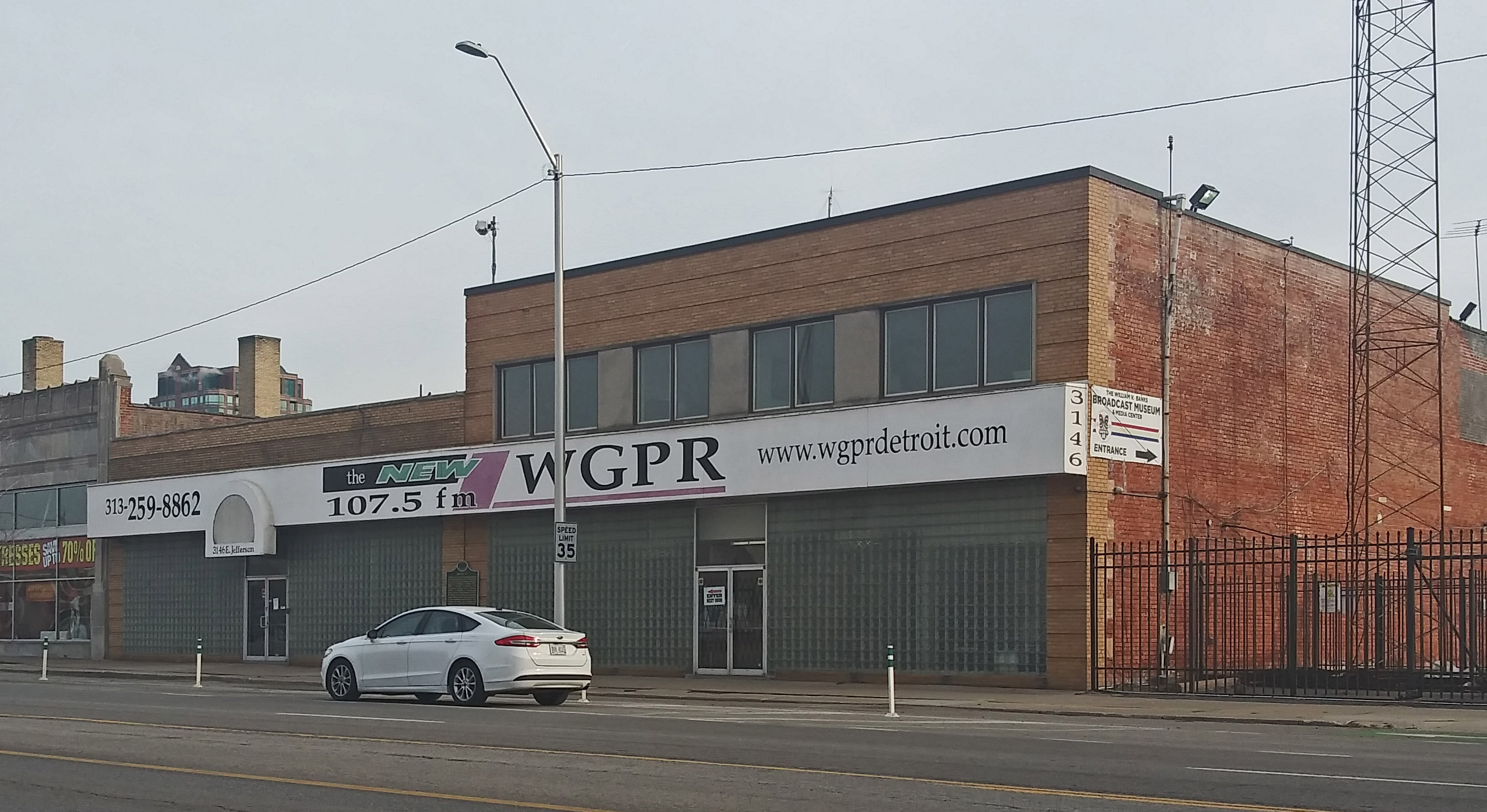
WGPR-TV Studio in Detroit, Michigan

In 1964, Banks, as the head of the International Free and Accepted Modern Masons, bought WGPR-FM, which became Detroit's first black owned and operated radio station. Within twelve years, it was generating over one million dollars income. Once the radio station was successful, Banks started WGPR-TV, the first black-owned and black-operated television station in the United States, which went live for the first time on September 29, 1975. WGPR-TV helped launched the careers of hundreds of African Americans in broadcasting.

== Freemasonry ==
Banks had briefly been a member of the Knights of Pythias of North America, South America, Europe, Asia, Africa and Australia in college, but he soon lost interest. Later, he joined an African American Masonic organization (unclear if it was a part of Prince Hall Freemasonry) and served as Vice-President for several years, but he became disillusioned and quit. On May 16, 1950, he founded the International Free and Accepted Modern Masons, an offshoot of Freemasonry but not a part of Prince Hall Freemasonry. This organization prohibited drinking, gambling, and immoral conduct at its events and billed itself as a "clean, Christian organization."

== Personal life ==
Banks married three times throughout his life: Rose, Ruth, and Ivy. His first two marriages ended in divorce. He died on August 24, 1985.
