= Grand L. Bush =

American actor

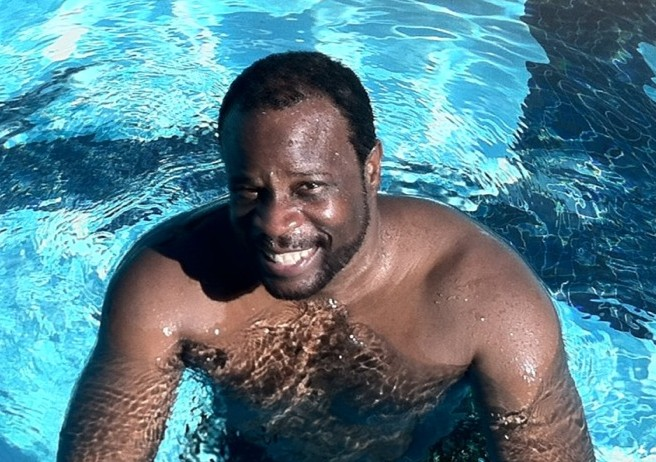
- Bush in 2012
- Born: December 24, 1955 (age 70); Los Angeles, California, U.S.
- Occupation: Actor
- Years active: 1976–2002
- Spouse: Sharon Dahlonega Bush (m. 1994)

Grand Lee Bush (born December 24, 1955) is an American retired actor of stage, television and film.

== Biography ==
Bush was born in Los Angeles, California, the son of actor Robert Bush and his wife Essie Bush. Shakespearean-trained, Bush studied film and theatre at the Los Angeles City College Theatre Academy, University of Southern California and the Strasberg Academy in Hollywood. He continued his education by performing at the historic Globe Theatre.

More than 35 feature films in which Bush has appeared have been archived as Turner Classic Movies. He is best known for his roles in Die Hard, Lethal Weapon, Lethal Weapon 2, Maniac Cop III, Demolition Man, Licence to Kill and Street Fighter. He retired from acting in 2003 and graduated from medical school in 2010.

== Filmography ==
=== Film ===
Year	Title	Role	Refs.
1979	Hair	Ensemble Dancer / Solo Artist: Flesh Failures	
1980	Stir Crazy	Slowpoke	
1980	The Night the City Screamed	Herbert Lee	
1982	Vice Squad	Black Pimp	
1982	Night Shift	Mustafa	
1982	Hard Feelings	Latham Lockhart	
1984	Weekend Pass	Bertram	
1984	Streets of Fire	Reggie / The Sorels	
1985	Brewster's Millions	Rudy	
1987	Lethal Weapon	Detective Dan Boyette	
1987	Hollywood Shuffle	Mandingo / Ricky Taylor / Hood #5	
1988	Colors	Larry "Looney Tunes" Sylvester	
1988	Die Hard	Little Johnson	
1989	Licence to Kill	Hawkins	
1989	Lethal Weapon 2	Jerry Collins	
1990	Bad Influence	Club bartender	
1990	Catchfire	Bank teller	
1990	The First Power	Reservoir worker	
1990	The Exorcist III	Sergeant Atkins	
1990	Secret Agent 00 Soul	Ben Douglas	
1991	Wedlock	Jasper	
1992	Freejack	Boone	
1993	Maniac Cop III: Badge of Silence	Willie	
1993	Demolition Man	Young Officer Zachary Lamb	
1994	Chasers	Vance Dooley	
1994	Street Fighter	Balrog	
1997	Turbulence	Marshal Al Arquette	
1997	Favorite Son	Reverend Ross	
2000	Building Bridges	Todd Bridges' Dad / Jim	
2001	Shark Hunter	Rob Harrington	
2002	New Alcatraz	Sergeant Quinn	

=== Television ===
Year	Title	Role	Notes
1976	Good Times	Leon	2 episodes
1977	Barnaby Jones	Doc Evans	Episode: "Gang War"
1978	The Incredible Hulk	Mike	Episode: "Never Give a Trucker an Even Break"
1978	CHiPS	Paul	Episode: "High Flyer"
1982	Police Squad!	The Champ	Episode: "Ring of Fear (A Dangerous Assignment)"
1982	The Jeffersons	George Nylund	Episode: "Appointment in 8B"
1983	The Renegades	Jewel	Episode: "Back to School"
1984	Airwolf	General Ali Butami	Episode: "And They Are Us"
1986–1993	Hunter	Officer Meyers/Billy/Blade	5 episodes
1986	Outlaws	Lt. Albert Ross	2 episodes
1987	Simon & Simon	Doug Raney	Episode: "Deep Water Death"
1987	Werewolf	Seaman	Episode: "Nightwatch"
1989	China Beach	Mac	Episode: "The World: Part 2"
1989	Murder, She Wrote	George Gordon	"Night of the Tarantula"
1992–1993	Renegade	Harry Wells	3 episodes
1996	Nash Bridges	Alex Peyton	Episode: "Til Death Do Us Part"
1997–1998	The Visitor	FBI Agent Douglas Wilcox	
1998–1999	Walker, Texas Ranger	Andros/Simon Trivette	2 episodes
1999	The Pretender	Detective Rusk	Episode: "Murder 101"
1999	Chicago Hope	Colonel Oswald Morton	Episode: "White Rabbit"
2000	18 Wheels of Justice	Eric Hodges	Episode: "Con Truck"
2001	Sheena	Kiptalami Chief	Episode: "Between a Rock and a Hard Place"
2002	JAG	USS Seahawk XO	Episode: "Enemy Below"
