= Sharon Dahlonega Bush =

American journalist

Sharon Raiford Bush
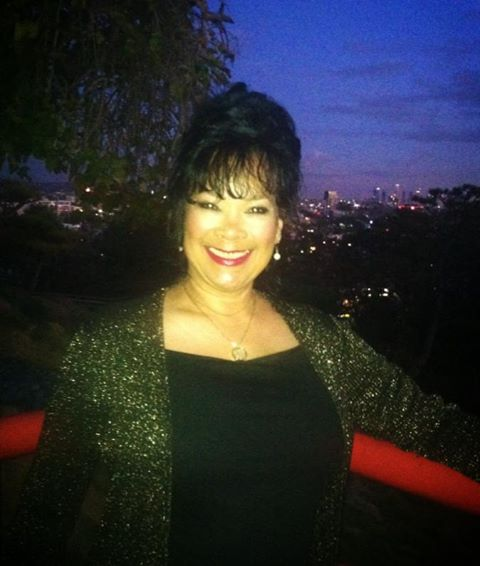
- Sharon Dahlonega Raiford Bush at Yamashiro Hollywood on December 7, 2013
- Born: Sharon Daisy Raiford; Greensboro, North Carolina, U.S.
- Other name: Sharon Crews
- Spouse: Grand L. Bush (m. 1994)

Sharon Dahlonega Bush (born Sharon Daisy Raiford) is an American television newscaster and print journalist. She was born in Greensboro, North Carolina, and resides in Los Angeles, California. She was an executive producer of the 1985 National Blues Music Awards.

== Education ==
Bush studied philosophy at North Carolina A&T State University. She later studied at the University of Detroit, the US Naval Air Technical Training Command and Georgia State University at Atlanta.

== Career ==
Bush became American television's first African-American female weather anchor of primetime news in 1975 at WGPR-TV, the US's first black-owned-and-operated television station.

Sharon Crews (as she was then known) later anchored news and weather at CBS and NBC network affiliates in North Carolina and Tennessee, respectively, before becoming an Atlanta, Georgia, correspondent and executive producer for Black Entertainment Television.

Bush worked as a morning news anchor at WGHP-TV, the then-ABC affiliate in High Point, North Carolina. She was an executive producer of the 1985 National Blues Music Awards.

== Personal life ==
Bush is married to Grand L. Bush.
