= Amyre Makupson =

American television personality

Amyre Makupson (/əˈmɪər ˈmeɪkəpsən/ ə-MEER MAY-kəp-sən) (née Porter; born September 30, 1947) is an American former news anchor and director of public affairs at WKBD in Detroit.

== Career ==
Makupson held positions at WSM-TV in Nashville and WRC-TV in Washington, D.C., before moving back to Detroit in 1975 to work as director of public relations for Head Start, the Michigan Health Maintenance Organization. That same year, Makupson was hired by WGPR-TV, the nation's first African-American owned television station, to anchor Big City News and the Detroit focused talk show Porterhouse.

In 1977, Makupson joined WKBD as news anchor and public affairs director. At WKBD, she hosted Morning Break, the station's daily talk show, and produced and anchored a five-minute newsbreak called TV50 News Scene. In 1985, Makupson was appointed co-anchor of WKBD's newly-launched Ten O'Clock News; beginning in 2001, she also began to anchor 62 CBS Eyewitness News at 11 on WKBD's sister station, WWJ-TV (ironically, the former WGPR). Amyre left the duopoly following the closure of the two stations' news department in December 2002.

Her parents, Dr. Rudolph Hannibal and Amyre Ann Porche Porter, sent her to Detroit's Visitation Catholic Elementary School and she graduated from St. Mary's Academy High School in Monroe, Michigan, in 1965. She earned her B.A. degree in dramatics and speech from Fisk University in 1970 and her M.A. degree in speech arts/communications theory from American University in 1972.

In November 2003, she acted in a local play in Detroit and wrote a book about death, So... What's Next?.

She was nominated for an Exemplary Volunteer Service Award by Michigan Gov. Jennifer Granholm in 2007.

Though she is now retired from television news, her daughter (also named Amyre Makupson) was recently a primary news anchor at WGXA in Macon, GA. Amyre II has since been hired by, ironically, her mother's old stations WWJ and WKBD, as "executive producer of community impact" for the new CBS News Detroit, set to launch in January 2023.
