= Syma Chowdhry =

American news anchor and reporter

- Born: Syma Chowdhry; Staten Island, New York
- Occupation: Reporter/On-Air Talent
- Years active: 1999-present

Syma Chowdhry is a television host, reporter, producer, news writer, model and actress. She currently works for News 12 New Jersey.

== Career ==
Chowdhry began her broadcasting career at News 14 Carolina in 2004 and later moved to News 12 New Jersey. In 2011, she became the news anchor for First Forecast Mornings, a weather-and-news morning show on WWJ-TV in Detroit. First Forecast Mornings ended on December 28, 2012.

In 2013, Chowdhry moved to Philadelphia to work at KYW-TV, another CBS-owned station. She then returned to Detroit at WXYZ-TV in 2016.

In 2021, Chowdhry announced she would leave WXYZ-TV and Detroit to relocate nearer extended family, returning to News 12. She opted to return to News 12 New Jersey.

Syma has modeled for The Rachael Ray Show, MTV, Pfizer and numerous print material, has appeared on Style Network and has appeared several times as an extra on Law & Order. She also hosted NYC-TV's show "Gigs" and ImaginAsianTV's "Pulse."

== Personal life ==
Syma Chowdhry was born on Staten Island, New York. Her father is from Pakistan and her mother is from Kerala, India. She has a brother named Ehsan Chowdhry. Syma and her family moved to the New Jersey shore when she was three years old. Syma grew up in Toms River, New Jersey and attended Toms River High School North.

== Pageant life ==
Syma competed in several pageants. In 2002, she competed in the Miss New Jersey 2002 pageant, finishing as 3rd runner up. Also that year, she placed 1st runner up in the Miss Pennsylvania USA pageant. In January 2003, she won the title of Miss Central Coast, qualifying again for Miss New Jersey.
