= WDTK =

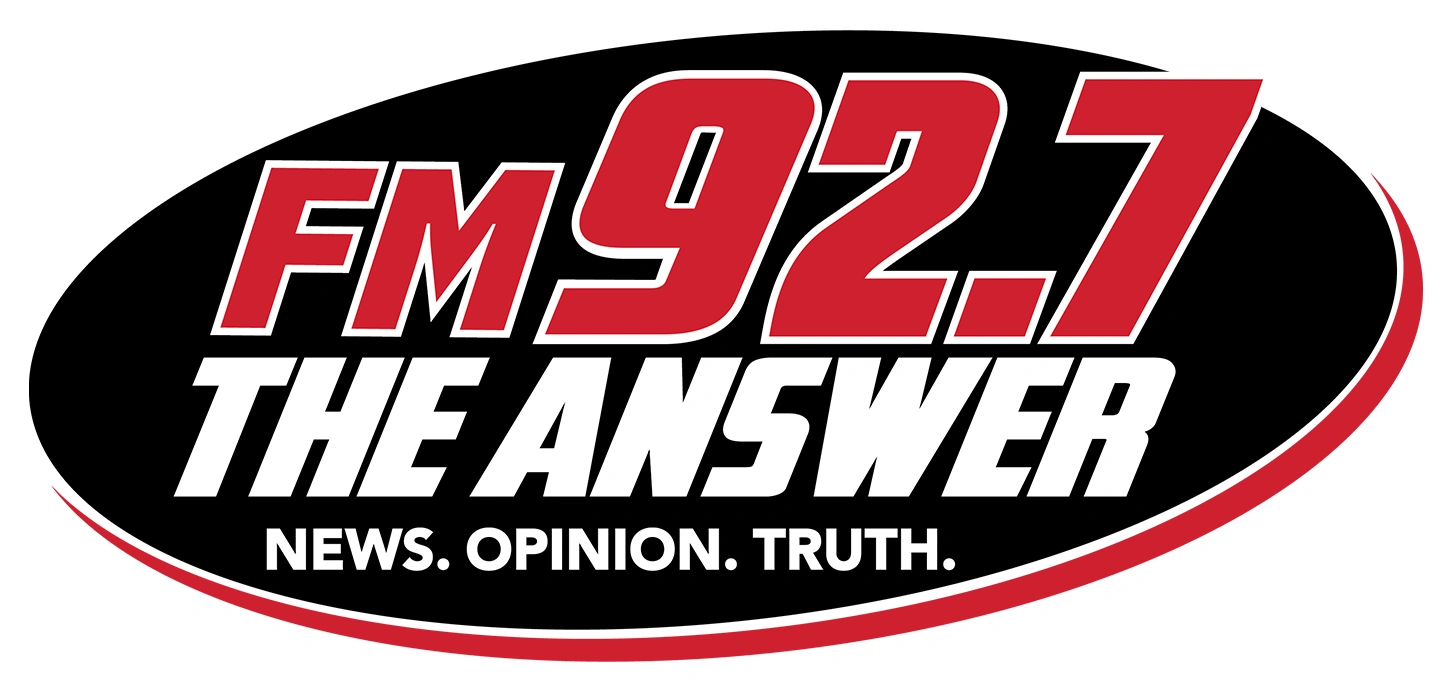
- Detroit, Michigan; United States
- Broadcast area: Metro Detroit
- Frequency: 1400 kHz
- Branding: 92.7 The Answer

Programming
- Format: Conservative talk radio
- Affiliations: Salem Radio Network; Townhall Radio News; Wayne State University

Ownership
- Owner: Salem Media Group; (Salem Communications Holding Corporation)
- Sister stations: WLQV

History
- First air date: November 1925
- Former call signs: WMBC (1925–39); WJLB (1939–80); WMZK (1980–82); WQBH (1982–2004)
- Call sign meaning: "Detroit talk"

Technical information
- Licensing authority: FCC
- Facility ID: 68641
- Class: C
- Power: 1,000 watts (unlimited)
- Transmitter coordinates: 42°24′22″N 83°6′44″W
- Translator: 92.7 W224CC (Detroit)

Links
- Public license information: Public file; LMS
- Webcast: Listen live
- Website: www.theanswerdetroit.com

WDTK (1400 AM) is a commercial radio station licensed to Detroit, Michigan, United States. Known as "The Answer," it broadcasts a conservative talk radio format and is owned by Salem Media Group. The studios and offices are on Radio Plaza in Ferndale, Michigan.

WDTK's transmitter is sited on Midland Street near Hamilton Avenue in Highland Park, Michigan. Programming is also heard on low-power FM translator W224CC on 92.7 MHz in Detroit.

== History ==
=== WMBC ===
The station signed on the air in November 1925. It broadcast on 1170 kHz as WMBC. The call sign stood for the station's original owners, the Michigan Broadcast Company. WMBC's frequency changed to 1230 in 1927 and to 1420 in 1930. WMBC was an early outlet for religious programming and gospel music in Detroit.

It was also the home of conservative radio commentator Jerry Buckley, who was shot dead in the lobby of the LaSalle Hotel in 1930 after successfully campaigning for a mayoral recall election in which then-mayor Charles Bowles lost. The LaSalle Hotel was not just where Jerry Buckley was killed; it actually housed the WMBC studios on its top floor. This meant Buckley was gunned down just moments after leaving his broadcast booth following the late-night election coverage.

=== WJLB ===
WMBC's call sign was changed to WJLB in 1939 after the station was acquired by John Lord Booth (who renamed the station for himself). In 1941, with the enactment of the North American Regional Broadcasting Agreement (NARBA), the station moved to its current home of 1400 kHz. Being a small independent station, WJLB relied on brokered programming to pay the bills.

Many of the paid shows were ethnic. This included many programs targeted toward Detroit's African-American community. One of WJLB's most popular programs during its early years was the Interracial Goodwill Hour, a jazz and R&B show hosted by later Cleveland radio legend Bill Randle.

By the 1960s, WJLB had competition for Detroit's black audience in the form of 1440 AM WCHB and later 107.5 FM WGPR. At that point, WJLB evolved into a mostly R&B and soul music station, using the slogan "Tiger Radio" for a time in the late 1960s. Perhaps WJLB's most well-known personality in the 1960s and 1970s was Martha Jean "The Queen" Steinberg. She was one of the first successful female air personalities in Detroit, best known for her trademark line, "I betcha!" On the evening of July 23, 1967 Steinberg got the station to cancel its regular programing and let her do a broadcast encouraging people to stop rioting. In the early 1970s, Steinberg led the WJLB air staff in protesting the fact that the station employed no African-Americans outside of the air personalities.

=== WMZK and WQBH ===
In 1980, in response to the growing popularity of FM radio, WJLB 1400 switched call signs and formats with its ethnic sister station, WMZK-FM 97.9. WJLB-FM began broadcasting an urban contemporary format and has been among top-rated station in Detroit. However, WJLB-FM dropped Steinberg's show. Meanwhile, the AM station took the callsign WMZK and its ethnic format.

Martha Jean the Queen found herself without a radio home until 1982, when a Steinberg-led group, the TXZ Corporation, purchased WMZK 1400 AM. The callsign was switched to WQBH (standing for the Queen Broadcasts Here). WQBH took on a full-service format of R&B and urban gospel music, along with African-American oriented talk which would continue for over two decades. With backing from the Michigan National Bank, Steinberg took full ownership of WQBH (as "Queen's Broadcasting Corporation") in 1997. After Steinberg's death in January 2000, ownership of the station reverted to a consortium of her three daughters and the Order of the Fisherman Ministry. WQBH continued to air broadcasts of Steinberg's past programs after her death.

=== WDTK ===
In March 2004, Salem Communications announced that it would be acquiring WQBH from the Steinberg family for $4.75 million. The sale was finalized in May, and in September, Salem changed WQBH's call sign to WDTK, which stands for Detroit TalK. It flipped the station to the current conservative talk format, using Salem Radio Network syndicated shows.

In late July 2012, WDTK added an FM translator. W224CC broadcast on 92.7 MHz, signing on with 99 watts of power.

In the Fall of 2014 the Patriot began covering the "Detroit Catholic High School League Game of the Week." Jeremy Otto and Sean Baligian called the action. In 2015, the station added an afternoon drive time show hosted by Brendan Johnson. Darryl Wood later replaced Johnson.

On November 18, 2016, WDTK stopped broadcasting on its FM translator on 92.7 MHz. It switched to a new translator in Oak Park, W268CN, on 101.5 MHz. The former translator on 92.7 remains on the air, but was repurposed as a repeater for sister station WLQV. The translator on 101.5 is on the same frequency as Toledo station WRVF. The two station's signals overlap in some suburbs south of Detroit.

On January 14, 2025, WDTK rebranded as "92.7 The Answer", now simulcasting on translator W224CC 92.7 FM Detroit. With this move, the former 101.5 FM translator was re-allocated as a translator for sister station WLQV.

== Programming ==
John Anthony hosts the station's local morning show; the remainder of WDTK's schedule is syndicated conservative talk shows sourced from the Salem Radio Network. Football and basketball games from Wayne State University are also broadcast.

== See also ==
- Media in Detroit
