= WFRO =

WFRO may refer to:

- WFRO (AM), a defunct radio station (900 AM) formerly licensed to Fremont, Ohio, United States
- WFRO-FM, a radio station (99.1 FM) licensed to Fremont, Ohio, United States
