= Jim Brandstatter =

American sports announcer

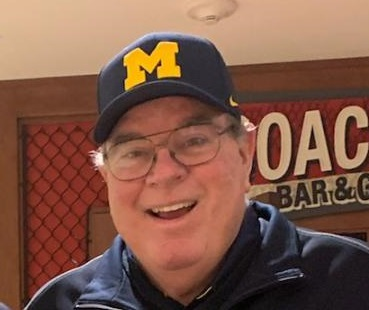
- Brandstatter in 2019
- Born: 1949 or 1950 (age 76–77); East Lansing, Michigan, U.S.
- Other names: "Brandy", "Duke"
- Education: University of Michigan
- Occupations: Sportscaster; television host; author
- Notable credits: Detroit Lions Radio Network (1987–2017); Michigan Sports Network (1979–2021); Michigan Replay/Inside Michigan Football (1980–2021)
- Spouse: Robbie Timmons
- Football career

No. 76 – Michigan Wolverines
- Position: Offensive tackle
- Class: 1971

Career information
- High school: East Lansing (MI)
- College: Michigan (1969–1971)

Awards and highlights
- Second-team All-Big Ten (1971); 2× Rose Bowl (1970, 1972)
- Website: www.jimbrandstatter.com

Jim Brandstatter (born 1949 or 1950) is an American former sportscaster. He served as a radio announcer for the Michigan Wolverines football team from 1979 to 2021, and for the Detroit Lions from 1987 to 2017. Brandstatter is also a sports television show host and former radio show host; both TV and radio shows about Michigan football.

Brandstatter played college football for the Wolverines, from 1969 to 1972, where he was a standout offensive tackle. Brandstatter has written two non-fiction books about UM experiences, both of which were best-sellers in the sports category. His other positions include the two-time president of the Detroit Sports Broadcasters Association. Brandstatter leaving the Detroit Lions radio broadcast was announced on July 10, 2018.

== Early life ==
=== Childhood and family ===
Brandstatter was born in East Lansing, Michigan, one of five boys born to Art Brandstatter Sr., an All-American fullback for the Michigan State Spartans football team in 1936. The elder Brandstatter worked as a Detroit Police officer before becoming head of the Michigan State University School of Criminal Justice, and later head of the Federal Law Enforcement Training Centers. Jim's older brother, Art Brandstatter Jr., played defensive end for the Spartans from 1959 to 1961. Despite the family's legacy at MSU, Jim Brandstatter opted to attend the school's in-state rival, the University of Michigan. "My brother Art played at Michigan State, and he was my hero," Brandstatter said. "I went to all the games. I got to know all the players, the team. I was just a 10-year-old kid. That was great, but when I got into high school and was playing, Michigan recruited me and I fell in love with the place. ... So I went against the grain, went to Michigan and never regretted it."

=== Sports career ===
Brandstatter entered the University of Michigan in the fall of 1968, and played that year on the freshman reserve football squad. From 1969 to 1972, he was an offensive tackle on the varsity team during Coach Bo Schembechler's first three seasons. Brandstatter later noted one of his favorite memories as a player came in a 1971 victory against Michigan State. Brandstatter recalled, "That was as good as it gets." He added: "Bo [Schembechler] used to say and [offensive line coach] Jerry Hanlon might say, I may have played my best game ever as a collegian in that game." Hanlon said about Brandstatter: "He got so fired up, he took over every defender that came his way." He added "It was one of the best games a tackle played for me. That particular game, he was an All-American."

Brandstatter made the All-Big Ten team in 1971 and played in two Rose Bowls, during his time with Michigan (1970 and 1972).

Brandstatter signed with the New England Patriots of the National Football League after going undrafted in the 1972 NFL draft, but was released during training camp in June. He joined the Lansing All Stars of the Midwest Football League in August 1974, where his brother Art was the head coach. He also played with the team in 1975 when they became the Lansing Capitals.

== Broadcasting career ==
=== Television ===
After graduating from the University of Michigan, Brandstatter was hired as the sports director of WEYI-TV in the Flint–Tri-Cities area. In 1975, Brandstatter was sports director at WILX-TV in the Lansing area. After two-and-a-half years, Brandstatter moved to Detroit and became a sports producer for WDIV.

In 1980, while working at WDIV, Brandstatter became the host of Michigan Replay, a weekly half-hour discussion, interview, and highlights program about Michigan Wolverines football. It originally featured his former head coach Bo Schembechler (until 1989). It later included former head coaches Gary Moeller (1990–1994), Lloyd Carr (1995–2007). In 2008 the TV Show became Inside Michigan Football with Coach Rich Rodriguez (2008–2010), and Brady Hoke (2011–2014). Inside Michigan Football continues with head coach Jim Harbaugh. After 30 years, Brandstatter remains the original host and the show has grown from being seen only in Southeastern Michigan to available nationwide on cable and satellite.

Besides football, Brandstatter has broadcast golf on the Michigan Open Golf Championship radio and television network, and was an associate producer on the Ameritech Showdown, the Emmy Award winning telecast of the state's PGA Skins game tournament.

=== Radio ===
Brandstatter formerly hosted a weekly college football radio show, called Brandy and Bo with Coach Bo Schembechler. Brandy and Bo talked with coaches previewing upcoming games and discussed issues facing collegiate football.

Brandstatter could be heard calling play-by-play of his alma mater's football games on the Michigan Sports Network, teaming with color analyst Dan Dierdorf, sideline reporter Doug Karsch. and studio analyst Jon Jansen until the end of the 2021 NCAA Division I FBS football season. From 1979 to 2013, Brandstatter was the color analyst on the Michigan radio broadcasts, while Frank Beckmann called play-by-play.

From 1987 until July 2018, Brandstatter worked as the radio color commentator for the Detroit Lions Radio Network.

Brandstatter also hosts the syndicated weekly Inside Michigan Football TV Show highlighting players, game day highlights and comments by Coach Jim Harbaugh and other coaches and players, along with Doug Karsch and Ed Kengerski during the college football season.

== Awards and honors ==
Brandstatter has been inducted into the Michigan Sports Hall of Fame in 2013. In 2014, the Michigan Association of Broadcasters Hall of Fame and the Gridiron Greats Hall of Fame added his name to their honor rolls. And in 2016, he was inducted into the Lansing Area Sports Hall of Fame. He was voted in 2004 and 2008 as "Sportscaster of the Year in Michigan" by the National Sportscasters/Sportswriters Association. He twice served as the president of the Detroit Sports Media Association (DSMA). In 2006, Brandstatter was named by the DSMA as the Ty Tyson Award winner for Excellence in Sports Broadcasting in Michigan. Brandy and Bo twice won Michigan Association of Broadcasters "Best in Category" honors. Michigan Replay/Inside Michigan Football has been nominated for Michigan Emmy Awards.

== Personal life ==
Brandstatter is married to broadcaster Robbie Timmons, whom he met in 1975 while they both worked at WILX-TV. While at that station in 1972, Timmons became the first woman to anchor the evening news in America, and later anchored the weekday news on WXYZ-TV in Detroit from 1982 until her retirement in 2010.

== Bibliography ==
- Tales from Michigan Stadium (2002)
- Tales from Michigan Stadium, Volume II (2005)
