= Bovine somatotropin =

Peptide hormone produced by cows' pituitary glands

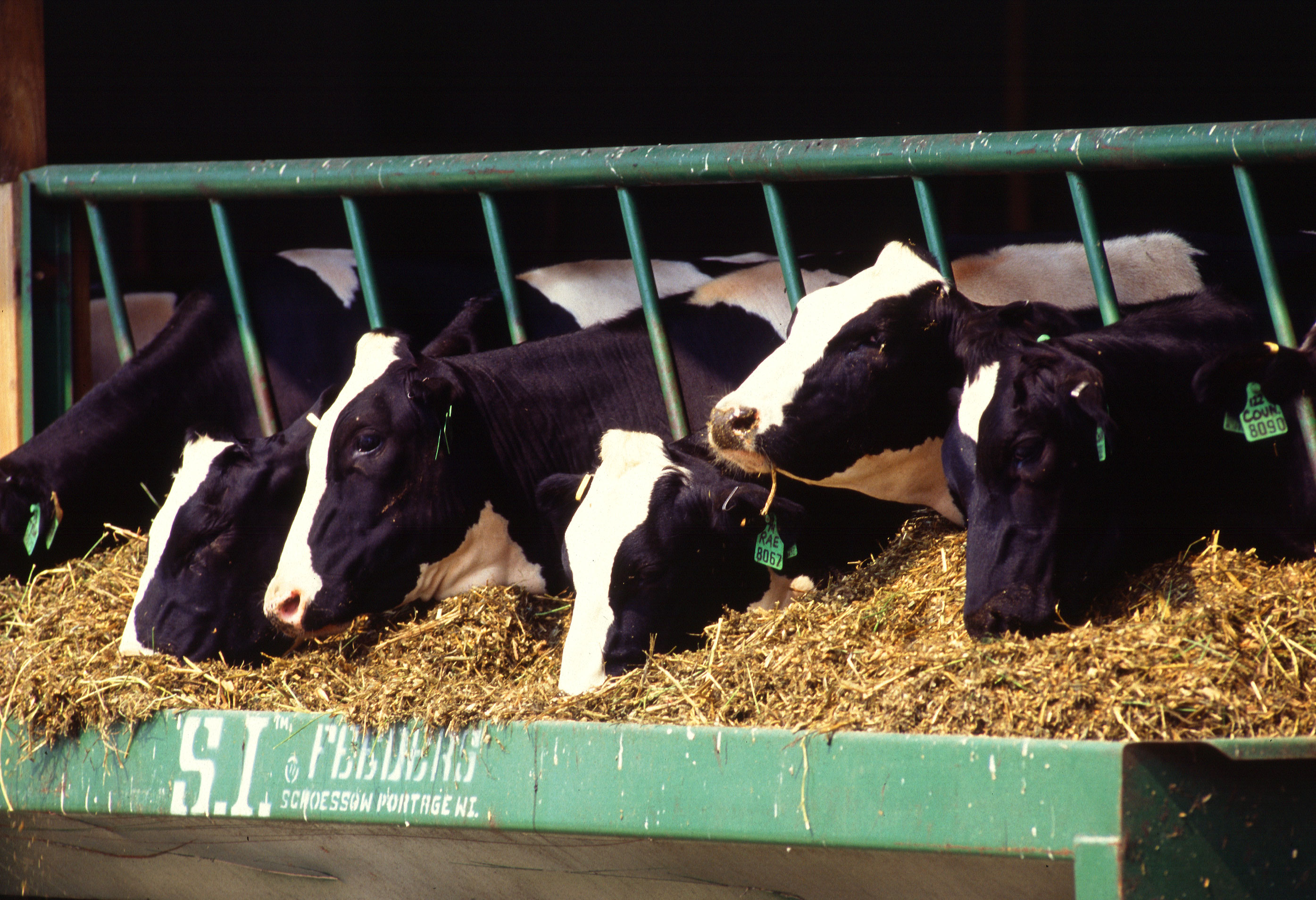
rBST is a product allowed only in certain jurisdictions and primarily given to dairy cattle by injection to increase milk production.

Bovine somatotropin or bovine somatotrophin (abbreviated bST and BST), or bovine growth hormone (BGH), is a peptide hormone produced by cows' pituitary glands. Like other hormones, it is produced in small quantities and is used in regulating metabolic processes. Recombinant bovine somatotropin (usually "rBST") is a synthetic version of the bovine growth hormone given to dairy cattle by injection to increase milk production. BST increases milk production by around 10 percent.

Controversy over its safety for cows has led to rBST being banned in several countries, including the European Union since 1990, and Canada, Japan, Pakistan, Australia, New Zealand, and Argentina, as it has been found to increase health risks in cows. The Codex Alimentarius has not approved it as safe.

The FDA approved it in 1993 and gave guidance to manufacturers that marking a product as "bST-free" or "rbST free" is misleading and a less misleading text would be "No significant difference has been shown between milk derived from rbST-treated and non-rbST-treated cows".

== Synthesis ==
After the biotech company Genentech discovered and patented the gene for BST in the 1970s, it became possible to synthesize the hormone using recombinant DNA technology to create recombinant bovine somatotropin (rBST), recombinant bovine growth hormone (rBGH), or artificial growth hormone.

== Industrial production ==
Four large pharmaceutical companies, Monsanto, American Cyanamid, Eli Lilly, and Upjohn, developed commercial rBST products and submitted them to the US Food and Drug Administration (FDA) for approval.

Monsanto was the first firm to receive approval; it has been sold in the USA since February 3, 1994.

Other countries (Mexico, Brazil, India, Russia, and at least ten others) also approved rBST for commercial use.

Monsanto licensed Genentech's patent and marketed their product as "Posilac". In October 2008, Monsanto sold this business, in full, to Eli Lilly and Company for $300 million plus additional consideration.

== History ==
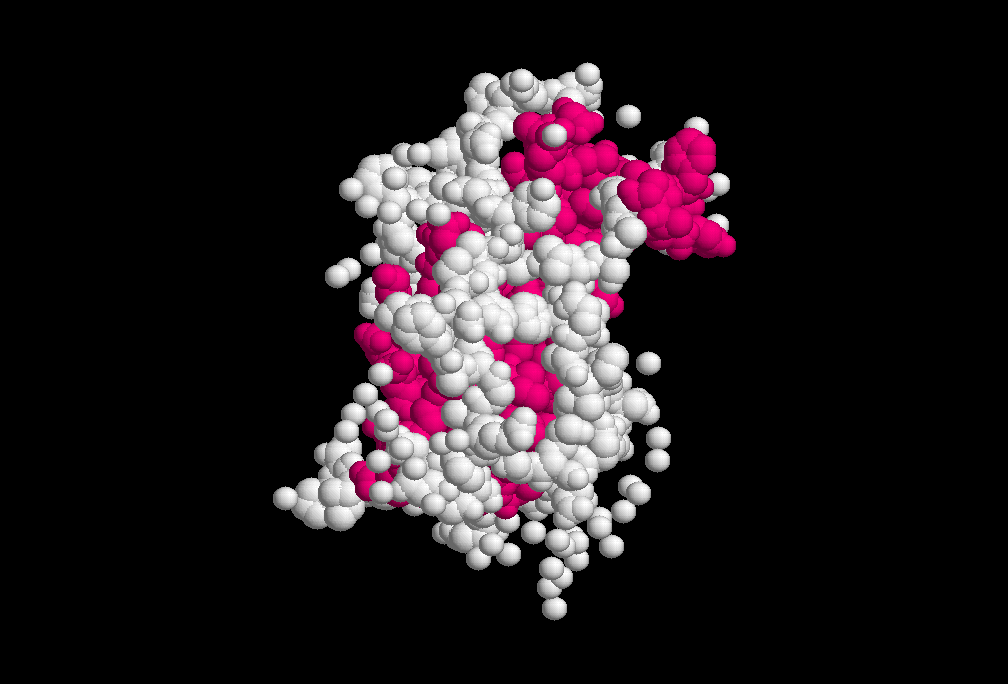
Image of peptide somatotropin.

In 1937, the administration of BST was shown to increase the milk yield in lactating cows by preventing mammary cell death in dairy cattle.

Until the 1980s, use of the compound was very limited in agriculture as the sole source of the hormone was from bovine carcasses. During this time, the knowledge of the structure and function of the hormone increased.

With the advent of biotechnology, one of the pioneering biotech companies, Genentech, in 1981 succeeded in cloning and patenting the gene for BST. Monsanto had been working along the same lines and struck a deal with Genentech in 1979 to license Genentech's patents and collaborate on development of a recombinant version of BST – a process on which Monsanto would invest $300 million. The two companies used genetic engineering to clone the BST gene into E. coli. The bacteria are grown in bioreactors, then broken up and separated from the rBST, which is purified to produce the injectable hormone. They published their first field trial results in 1981.

Lilly, American Cyanamid, Upjohn, and Monsanto all submitted applications to market rBST to the FDA, and the FDA completed its review of the human safety component of these applications in 1986 and found food from rBST-treated cows to be safe; however, strong public concern led to calls for more studies, investigations, and public discussions, which included an unprecedented conference on the safety of rBST in 1990 organized by the National Institutes of Health at the request of Senator Patrick Leahy. FDA approved Monsanto's application in 1993. Monsanto launched rBST, brand-named "Posilac", in 1994.

== Mechanism of action ==
An average dairy cow begins her lactation with a moderate daily level of milk production. This daily output increases until, at about 70 days into the lactation, production peaks. From that time until the cow is dry, production slowly decreases. This increase and decrease in production is partially caused by the count of milk-producing cells in the udder. Cell counts begin at a moderate number, increase during the first part of the lactation, then decrease as the lactation proceeds. Once lost, these cells generally do not regrow until the next lactation.

Administration of rBST or BST prior to peak production, in cows that are well-fed, slows the rate at which the number of mammary cells decreases, and increases the amount of nutrients directed away from fat and toward the mammary cells, leading to an extension of peak milk production. The effects are mediated by the insulin-like growth factor (IGF) system, which is upregulated in response to BST or rBST administration in well-fed cows.

== Use on farms ==
From 2000 to 2005, the US Department of Agriculture National Agricultural Statistics Service survey of dairy producers found that about 17% of producers used rBST. The 2010 USDA National Agricultural Statistics Service survey of Wisconsin farms found that about 18% of dairy farms used rBST and 56% of dairy cows were given rBST.

=== Role in synchronized fertilization on dairy farms ===
By using cows that produce offspring within a one to two-week period, synchronized breeding allows dairy farmers to artificially inseminate cows for maximum pregnancy rates with minimal effort. BST is a placental lactogen (PL) hormone and falls under the class of growth hormone, or somatotropin. It is relevant to the practice of artificially expediting placental development in farm mammals, specifically dairy cattle.

The mechanism through which the hormones of this somatotropin exert their effects can be observed at the cellular and molecular level in placental tissue. For mammals exposed to the hormone, bovine somatotropin associates with N-glycosylated proteins that are heavily involved in placental gestation. Knowledge of this and how BST works in conjunction with growth hormones allows for agricultural researchers to experiment on the effects of synchronization in farm animals.

Synchronization involves treating cattle with a dose of BST before artificially inseminating them, according to a fixed interval schedule. Synchronization and BST treatment may be used to increase first-service pregnancy rates while following this timed artificial insemination protocol. This would therefore allow agricultural researchers to observe the effects of hormones in relation to natural estrous cycles. Dairy cattle experienced increased rates of pregnancy during synchronization when exposed to BST.

The effects of BST on this treatment are dependent on the step in the estrous cycle, seeing how BST has a stimulatory effect of progesterone on the corpus luteum.

== Controversy ==
Though approved by the FDA in 1993, rBST has been immersed in controversy since the early 1980s. Part of the controversy concerns potential effects on animal health and human health.

=== Animal health ===
One meta-analysis published in 2003 suggested a negative impact of rBST's effects on bovine health. Findings suggested an average increase in milk output ranging from 11–16%, an approximate 24% increase in the risk of clinical mastitis, a 40% reduction in fertility, and 55% increased risk of developing clinical signs of lameness. The same study reported a decrease in body condition score for cows treated with rBST, though an increase in their dry matter intake occurred.

Another meta-analysis (2003) reported on body condition scores (BCS) but could not reach a conclusion due to lack of homogeneity in study design and reporting. They found a trend towards decreased BCS in treated cows but state "Depending on the level of body condition in these cows, this effect may have been beneficial or detrimental." This analysis did not report on clinical mastitis.

A more recent meta-analysis (2014) published by the Journal of the American Veterinary Medical Association showed no significant increase in risk of clinical mastitis nor other adverse effects on cow health and well-being. This review included 26 peer-reviewed studies that involved the use of the rBST-Zn formulation available to US producers in accordance with the label instructions for treatment initiation (57 to 70 days after birth), dose (500 mg, every 14 days), and route (subcutaneous).

Mastitis has cost American dairy industries an estimated $1.5 to 2 billion per year in treating dairy cows.

In 1994, an EU scientific commission was asked to report on the incidence of mastitis and other disorders in dairy cows and on other aspects of their welfare. The commission's statement, subsequently adopted by the EU, stated that the use of rBST substantially increased health problems with cows, including foot problems, mastitis, and injection site reactions, impinged on the welfare of the animals, and caused reproductive disorders. The report concluded, on the basis of the health and welfare of the animals, rBST should not be used. Health Canada prohibited the sale of rBST in 1999; the external committees found that there was health risk to humans, and the drug present a threat to animal health, and, for this reason, cannot be sold in Canada.

Monsanto-sponsored trials reviewed by the FDA asked whether the use of rBST makes cows more susceptible to mastitis. According to the FDA, which used data from eight Monsanto-sponsored trials in its decision in 1993 to approve Monsanto's rBST product, the answer is yes. The data from these eight trials, which involved 487 cows, showed that during the period of rBST treatment, mastitis incidence increased by 76% in primiparous cows and by 50% for multiparous cows. Overall, the increase was 53%.

Conversely, however, a study from the University of Georgia on the monitoring post-approval of rBST, showed that there was no statistically significant (P > 0.05) derivation in cases of clinical mastitis in dairy cows treated with rBST.

==== Macronutrient composition ====
The overall composition of the milk including the fat, protein, and lactose content is not altered substantially by the use of rBST in dairy cows. The milk may have a slight change in fat content within the first few weeks of rBST treatment as the cow is allowed to adjust her metabolism and feed intake. The changes in the fat content have been shown to be temporary. The composition of the milk has been examined in more than 200 different experiments. Natural variation within milk is normal with or without rBST treatment in cows due to genetics, location, feed, age, and other environmental factors. Protein in milk content has also been studied and was shown to have no apparent change in rBST treated cows. The vitamins and minerals that are normally in milk were also unaltered in milk from rBST treated cows. Freezing point, pH, thermal properties, and other manufacturing characteristics of milk were shown to be the same regardless of whether it came from rBST treated cows or not.

==== Hormones ====
BST is destroyed in the digestive system and even if directly injected, has not been found to have any direct effect on humans. Researchers have found that "IGF-1 in milk is not denatured by pasteurization and the extent to which intact, active IGF-1 is absorbed through the human digestive tract remains still however uncertain" implicating that an extensive study on the nature of IGF-1 in relation to rBST milk is required.

FDA rBST labeling guidelines state, "FDA is concerned that the term 'rBST free' may imply a compositional difference between milk from treated and untreated cows rather than a difference in the way the milk is produced. Without proper context, such statements could be misleading. Such unqualified statements may imply that milk from untreated cows is safer or of higher quality than milk from treated cows. Such an implication would be false and misleading". The FDA has determined that no significant difference has been shown between milk derived from rBST treated and non-rBST treated cows.

The FDA, World Health Organization, and National Institutes of Health have independently stated that dairy products and meat from rBST-treated cows are safe for human consumption. The American Cancer Society issued a report declaring, "The evidence for potential harm to humans [from rBGH milk] is inconclusive. It is not clear that drinking milk produced using rBGH significantly increases IGF-1 levels in humans or adds to the risk of developing cancer. More research is needed to help better address these concerns."

=== Human health ===
The effect of rBGH on human health is an ongoing debate, in part due to the lack of conclusive evidence. A few of the most debated issues include:

Insulin-like growth factor 1 (IGF-1) is a hormone found in humans that is responsible for growth promotion, protein synthesis, and insulin actions over the lifecycle. The hormone has been shown to influence the growth of tumors in some studies and may be linked to the development of prostate, colorectal, breast, and other cancers.

IGF-1 is also found in milk. Previous research has proposed an increase of IGF-1 in rBST-treated cows, but this claim is currently not substantiated. In addition, no current evidence shows that orally consumed IGF-1 is absorbed in humans and the dietary amount is negligible when compared to what the body produces on its own. "IGF-1 in milk is not denatured (inactivated) by pasteurization. The extent to which intact, active IGF-1 is absorbed through the human digestive tract remains uncertain."

The American Cancer Society has reviewed the evidence concerning IGF-1 in milk from rBST-treated cows, and found that: "While there may be a link between IGF-1 blood levels and cancer, the exact nature of this link remains unclear. Some studies have shown that adults who drink milk have about 10% higher levels of IGF-1 in their blood than those who drink little or no milk. But this same finding has also been reported in people who drink soy milk. This suggests that the increase in IGF-1 may not be specific to cow's milk, and may be caused by protein, minerals, or some other factors in milk unrelated to rBGH. There have been no direct comparisons of IGF-1 levels in people who drink ordinary cow's milk vs. milk stimulated by rBST. At this time, it is not clear that drinking milk, produced with or without rBST treatment, increases blood IGF-1 levels into a range that might be of concern regarding cancer risk or other health effects. IGF-1 concentrations are slightly higher (to variable degrees, depending on the study) in milk from cows treated with rBST than in untreated milk. This variability is presumed to be much less than the normal range of variation of IGF-1 in cow's milk due to natural factors, but more research is needed."

As of 2014, evidence does not link rBST-treated milk with adverse health outcomes for children. Several studies have looked at the relationship between type 1 diabetes mellitus and infant feeding. Environmental triggers that may elicit an autoimmune reaction is the mechanism in which is being studied. Some studies have shown early exposure to bovine milk may predispose an infant to type 1 diabetes, whereas other studies show no causality.

The American Society of Animal Science published an article in 2014 after reviewing health issues arising from the rBST debate. The article indicated "there are no new human health issues related to the use of rBST by the dairy industry. Use of rBST has no effect on the micro- and macrocomposition of milk. Also, no evidence exists that rBST use has increased human exposure to antibiotic residues in milk. Concerns that IGF-1 present in milk could have biological effects on humans have been allayed by studies showing that oral consumption of IGF-1 by humans has little or no biological activity. Additionally, concentrations of IGF-1 in digestive tract fluids of humans far exceed any IGF-1 consumed when drinking milk. Furthermore, chronic supplementation of cows with rBST does not increase concentrations of milk IGF-1 outside the range typically observed for effects of farm, parity, or stage of lactation. Use of rBST has not affected expression of retroviruses in cattle or posed an increased risk to human health from retroviruses in cattle. Furthermore, risk for development of type 1 or type 2 diabetes mellitus has not increased in children or adults consuming milk and dairy products from rBST-supplemented cows. Overall, milk and dairy products provide essential nutrients and related benefits in health maintenance and the prevention of chronic diseases."

Keeping in mind that bovine somatotropin is a protein growth hormone, it can increase average milk yield anywhere from 10 to 15%, which in turn would lead to cows consuming substantially more nutrients in order to keep up with the increased milk production. Most of a cow's energy consumption goes directly towards milk production. In certain areas of the world, like Ethiopia where this was studied extensively, as the cows needed to intake more nutrition to balance out their milk production, there was also an increased level of chemical fertilizers and heavy metal traces found in the milk due to increased exposure to agricultural chemicals. These chemicals can then easily be passed on to humans and lead to a contaminated milk supply. BST increases the longevity or the activity of the mammary cell leading to higher milk production and some other non-desirable side effects.

Despite public controversy of the use of growth hormones in food-producing animals, the number of violations has decreased substantially in the past two decades. For comparison, the level of antibiotic-residue detected in bulk milk tank trucks in 2012 was one fifth the level that it was in 1996. As reported by the USDA, the US pattern for milk BTSCC (Bulk-tank somatic cell counts, a measure of the level of white blood cells, squamous cells, and secretory cells per mL of raw milk) declined steadily from 316,000 cells per mL of milk in 2001 to 224,000 cells/mL in 2010 and 206,000 cells/mL in 2011 (USDA, 2013). Mammary health in the animals themselves has improved over this time period as well as the overall health of the dairy herd in general. This is mostly attributed to better application methods of rBST and a better understanding of how the hormone affects the animals.

=== Environmental impact ===
On an industry level, supplementing one million cows with rBST would result in the same amount of milk produced while needing 157,000 fewer cows. Farmers are, therefore, able to improve milk production with a smaller dairy population.

Some studies show that rBST-treated cows reduce the greenhouse gas footprint in comparison with conventional and organic dairy operations. Cady's study showed that excretion of nitrogen and phosphorus, two major environmental pollutants arising from animal agriculture, was reduced by 9.1 and 11.8%, respectively. Carbon dioxide is recognized to be the most important anthropogenic greenhouse gas, and livestock metabolism and fossil fuel consumption are the main sources of emissions from animal agriculture.

- Livestock metabolism-use of rBST in lactating cows decreases the quantity of energy and protein needed in comparison to conventional dairy operations along with reducing the total foodstuff used.
- Fossil fuel consumption-targets atmospheric pollution and resource sustainability environmental concerns. With cows treated with rBST, producing a higher milk yield reduces the feed requirement which in turn decreases with electricity for milk production and the energy required from fossil fuels for cropping. In addition, the global warming potential is reduced equivalent to removing 400,000 family cars from the road.

When conventional, conventional with rBST, and organic dairy operations are compared, 8% fewer cows are needed in an rBST-supplemented population, whereas organic production systems require a 25% increase to meet production targets. This is due to a lower milk yield per cow due to the pasture-based system which is attributed with a greater maintenance energy expenditure associated with grazing behavior.

=== Lawsuit against WTVT ===
In 1997, the news division of WTVT (Channel 13), a Fox-owned station in Tampa, Florida, planned to air an investigative report by Steve Wilson and Jane Akre on the health risks associated with Monsanto's bovine growth hormone product, Posilac. Just before the story was to air, Fox received a letter from Monsanto saying the reporters were biased and that the story would damage the company. Akre stated that Wilson and she went through 83 rewrites over eight months. Negotiations broke down and both reporters were eventually fired. Wilson and Akre alleged the firing was for retaliation, while WTVT contended they were fired for insubordination. The reporters then sued Fox/WTVT in Florida state court under the state's whistleblower statute. In 2000, a Florida jury found that while no evidence showed Fox/WTVT had bowed to any pressure from Monsanto to alter the story, Akre, but not Wilson, was a whistleblower and was unjustly fired. She was awarded a $425,000 settlement. At the time of the decision, "the station claimed it did not bend to Monsanto's letter and wanted to air a hard-hitting story with a number of statements critical of Monsanto." Fox appealed the decision stating that under Florida law, a whistleblower can only act if "a law, rule, or regulation" has been broken and argued that the FCC's policy against distortions or misrepresentations presented as news did not fit that definition. On 14 February 2003, the appeals court overturned the verdict, finding that Akre was not a whistleblower because of the Florida "legislature's requirement that agency statements that fit the definition of a "rule" (must) be formally adopted (rules). Recognizing an uncodified agency policy developed through the adjudicative process as the equivalent of a formally adopted rule is not consistent with this policy, and it would expand the scope of conduct that could subject an employer to liability beyond what Florida's Legislature could have contemplated when it enacted the whistle-blower's statute."

== Regulation ==
Use of the recombinant supplement has been controversial. The assessment of the FDA is that there is no significant difference between milk from treated and untreated cows. Twenty-one other countries have also approved marketing of rBST: Brazil, Chile, Colombia, Costa Rica, Ecuador, Egypt, Guatemala, Honduras, Jamaica, Lebanon, Mexico, Panama, Paraguay, Peru, Salvador, South Africa, South Korea, Uruguay, and Venezuela. However, regulatory bodies in several countries, such as Canada, Japan, Pakistan, Australia, New Zealand, and Argentina, along with the EU, rejected Monsanto's application to sell rBST because rBST increases the risk of health problems in cows, including mastitis, reduced fertility, and reduced body condition. In Canada, bulk milk products from the United States that have been produced with rBST are still allowed to be sold and used in food manufacture (cheese, yogurt, etc.) due to loopholes in the ingredient labelling system. The FDA, World Health Organization, and National Institutes of Health have independently stated that dairy products and meat from rBST-treated cows are safe for human consumption.

In 1990, the EU placed a moratorium on its sale by all member nations. It was turned into a permanent ban starting from 1 January 2000; the decision was based solely on veterinary concerns, laws, and treaties. An in-depth report published in 1999 analysed in detail the various human health risks associated with rBST. The report also raised animal welfare concerns, stating that rBST often results in "severe and unnecessary pain, suffering and distress" for cows, and is "associated with serious mastitis, foot disorders and some reproductive problems".

In Canada, rBST has not been allowed on the market since at least 2000. Health Canada refused to approve rBST for use on Canadian dairies, citing concerns over animal health. The study found the occurrence of an antibody reaction, possible hypersensitivity, in a subchronic (90-day) study of rbST oral toxicity in rats that resulted in one test animal's developing an antibody response at low dose (0.1 mg/kg/day) after 14 weeks. However, the board stated, with the exception of concerns raised regarding hypersensitivity, "the panel finds no biologically plausible reason for concern about human safety if rBST were to be approved for sale in Canada."

The Codex Alimentarius Commission, a United Nations body that sets international food standards, has, as of 2017, refused to approve rBST as safe. The Codex Alimentarius does not have authority to ban or approve the hormone, but its decisions are regarded as a standard and approval by the Codex would have allowed exporting countries to challenge countries with a ban on rBST before the World Trade Organization.

=== Abuse on dairy farms ===
Recombinant bovine somatotropin is an artificially synthesized form of the bovine growth hormone. It is legal for use as an artificial cattle lactation stimulant in several countries, including the US. However, its use is prohibited in most of Europe for reasons of consumer preference, animal well-being, and skepticism of new technology. Farmers who opt to use the synthetic hormone do so because they believe it increases milk production without other inputs. However, concerns of both product safety and livestock abuse have prompted discussions for new methods in assaying the levels of dairy cattle rBST. One proposed method involves quantifying the presence or absence of the rBST-binding antibody in serum. However, this method would require blood samples to be taken regularly and is thus considered by some critics to be too invasive. The development of other alternative methods continues. One such example, tested by W.W. Thatcher at the University of Florida, involves collecting milk samples from the cows and analyzing them directly for the presence of the rBST antibody. Dairy cattle do respond to the rBST antigen and have shown positive results in immunosorbent trials on milk samples. Tests involving pasteurized milk samples have even shown consistent results, with immunoglobulin rBST still detectable and distinguishable despite other antibodies remaining present. Research on the viability of this new technique, as well as many others, as a means of monitoring the levels of rBST in dairy cattle continues to be an issue of practicality, profitability, and humaneness towards livestock in the dairy industry.

=== United States ===
In 1993, the product was approved for use in the US by the FDA, and its use began in 1994. The product is now sold in all 50 states.

The FDA stated that food products made from rBST-treated cows are safe for human consumption, and no statistically significant difference exists between milk derived from rBST-treated and untreated cows. The FDA found BST to be biologically inactive when consumed by humans and found no biological distinction between rBST and BST. In 1990, an independent panel convened by the National Institute of Health supported the FDA opinion that milk and meat from cows supplemented with rBST is safe for human consumption.

==== Labeling ====
The FDA does not require special labels for products produced from cows given rBST, but has charged several dairies with "misbranding" their milk as having no hormones, because all milk contains hormones and cannot be produced in such a way that it would not contain any hormones. Monsanto sued Oakhurst Dairy of Maine over its use of a label which pledged not to use artificial growth hormones. The dairy stated that its disagreement was not over the scientific evidence for the safety of rBST (Monsanto's complaint about the label), but, "We're in the business of marketing milk, not Monsanto's drugs." The suit was settled when the dairy agreed to add a qualifying statement to its label: "FDA states: No significant difference in milk from cows treated with artificial growth hormones." The FDA recommends this additional labeling, but does not require it. The settlement itself caused much controversy, with anti-rBST advocates claiming that Oakhurst had capitulated in response to intimidation by a larger corporation and others claiming that Oakhurst's milk labels were in and of themselves using misleading scare tactics that deserved legal and legislative response.

==== Ohio ====
In 2008, Ohio's Department of Agriculture (ODA) banned the use of labeling in dairy products as rBST-free because it was deemed misleading to consumers. However, the International Dairy Foods Association and the Organic Trade Association claimed ODA's ban was a violation of the first amendment by not allowing consumers to decide whether they deem the milk was safe and filed suit against the bill. "The district court granted summary judgment in favor of Ohio, concluding that using 'rBST' as a label was inherently misleading because it implies a compositional difference between those products that are produced with rBST and those that are not."

==== Kansas ====
In 2009, the Kansas Legislature passed a bill that would have required dairies that did not use rBST to print disclaimers on their labels that stated, "The Food and Drug Administration has determined there are no significant differences between milk from cows that receive injections of the artificial hormone and milk from those that do not." The bill was vetoed in the last days of the 2009 legislative session by then-Governor Kathleen Sebelius. The legislature removed the labeling language and passed the bill without the provision.

==== Pennsylvania ====
In 2007, Pennsylvania adopted a regulation that would have banned the practice of labeling milk as derived from cows not treated with rBST. Pennsylvania's Agriculture Secretary Dennis Wolff made a statement in support of the measure. This prohibition was to go into effect 1 January 2008, but after the comment period, the guidelines were adjusted to only ban "rBST-free" claims and instead allow claims that farmers had pledged not to use rBST and accompany such claims with a disclaimer such as, "No significant difference has been shown between milk derived from rBST-treated and non-rBST-treated cows."

== Response from milk producers and retailers ==
In response to concerns from consumers and advocacy groups about milk from cows treated with rBST, some dairies, retailers, and restaurants have published policies on use of rBST in production of milk products they sell, while others offer some products or product lines that are labelled "rBST-free" or the like. Other dairies and industry groups have worked to assure the public that milk from rBST-treated cows is safe.

In reaction to these trends, in early 2008, a pro-rBST advocacy group called American Farmers for the Advancement and Conservation of Technology (AFACT), made up of dairies and originally affiliated with Monsanto, formed and began lobbying to ban such labels. AFACT stated that "absence" labels can be misleading and imply that milk from cows treated with rBST is inferior. The organization was dissolved in 2011.

The International Dairy Foods Association has compiled a list, last updated in 2009, of state regulations in the U.S. for referencing use of growth hormones on milk labels.

=== Response from health organizations ===
- The American Cancer Society "has no formal position regarding rBGH".
- The American Nurses Association supports the development of national and state laws, regulations, and policies that specifically reduce the use of rBGH or rBST in milk and dairy production in the United States.

=== Response from political organizations ===
- Health Care Without Harm opposes the use of recombinant bovine growth hormone due to its adverse impacts on animals and potential harm to humans.
- Oregon Physicians for Social Responsibility recommends buying products from cows not injected with recombinant bovine growth hormone (rBGH or rBST).

=== Production and profitability ===
One study found a profit of $15.88 US per cow on average by using rBST.

== See also ==
- Genetic engineering
- Genetically modified food
- Growth hormone treatment
- Industrial agriculture
- List of recombinant proteins
- Recombinant DNA
- Somatotropin family
