= Denby High School =

High school in Detroit, Wayne County, Michigan

Edwin Denby High School
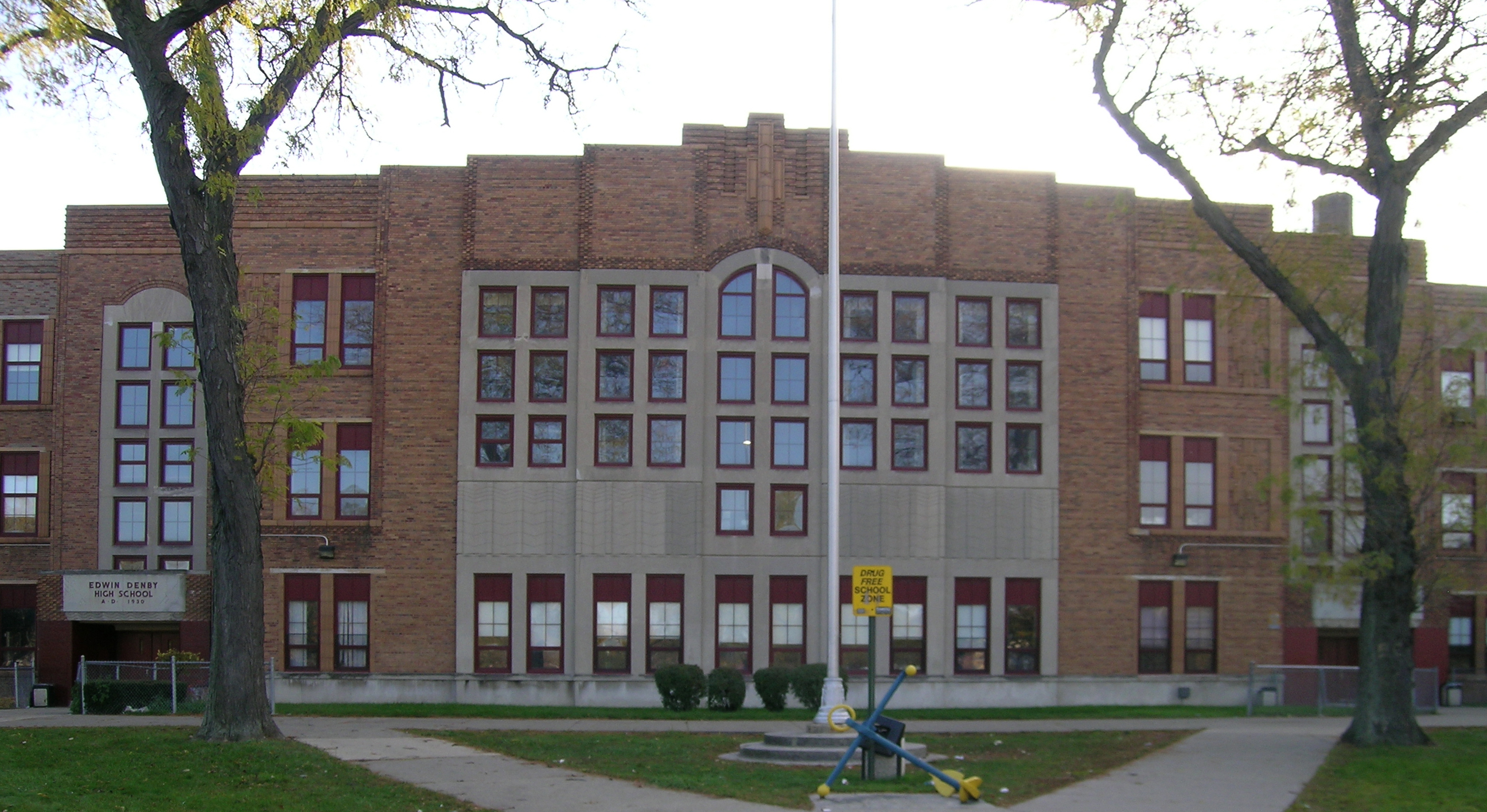

Location
- 12800 Kelly Road; Detroit, Michigan; United States; 42.4257°N 82.9587°W

Information
- Type: Public secondary
- Opened: 1930
- School district: Detroit Public Schools Community District
- Principal: Tanisha Manningham
- Teaching staff: 28.10 (FTE)
- Grades: 9–12
- Enrollment: 512 (2023-2024)
- Student to teacher ratio: 18.22
- Colors: Blue and gold
- Nickname: Tars
- Newspaper: The Denby Beacon
- Website: Denby High School
- Denby High School
- U.S. National Register of Historic Places
- Built: 1930
- Architect: Smith, Hinchman & Grylls
- Architectural style: Art Deco
- NRHP reference No.: 04001581
- Added to NRHP: February 2, 2005

Student assessments
- 2021–22 school year Change vs. prior year

M-STEP 11th grade proficiency rates (Science / Social Studies)
- Advanced %: ≤5 / ≤5
- Proficient %: ≤5 / ≤5
- PR. Proficient %: – / –
- Not Proficient %: – / –

Average test scores
- SAT Total: 733.1 (▼ −89.8)

The Edwin C. Denby High School is a public secondary education school located at 12800 Kelly Road in northeastern Detroit, Michigan, United States. Denby High opened in 1930, and the building was listed on the National Register of Historic Places in 2005. It is a part of Detroit Public Schools Community District.

== History ==
The school was named for Edwin C. Denby, an attorney and former Michigan legislator. Mr. Denby served as Secretary of the Navy during the administration of Warren G. Harding. Denby was forced to resign his position and narrowly avoided criminal indictment for his role in what came to be known as the Teapot Dome scandal. Denby died in 1929, and the Detroit School Board quickly voted to name a new high school after him "at the earliest opportunity."

Later in 1929, the school board authorized the construction of this school and hired the firm of Smith, Hinchman & Grylls to design it. The building cost $351,649, with an additional $145,991 for the land the school is sited on. The first unit of the school, containing 19 classrooms, two study halls, and an office, opened in 1930 with about 1000 students and 38 teachers. However, only two months after the school opened, work began on a major addition. The addition, costing $338,121 and containing sixteen additional classrooms and four study halls, was completed in 1931. Enrollment soared to 2600 in 1931, and by 1934, Denby adopted double sessions to relieve the overcrowding. A third unit of the school was planned in 1938 and completed in 1939 at a cost of $893,000. This unit contained seventeen additional classrooms, art and music rooms, "domestic science" classrooms, two machine shops, an auditorium which seated 2,230, a large gymnasium with an indoor track, and a swimming pool.

The third unit gave Denby a capacity of 2875 students. In 1942, 830 students graduated from the high school, and over 800 graduated each year from 1946 through 1960. The school converted to a three-year high school in 1960, with ninth graders moved to junior high schools. The school still averaged about 800 graduates per year through 1975, but the number of students graduating declined sharply in the late 1970s to a low of only 269 in 1980.

On March 11, 1997, 21-year-old Allen Lane Griffin shot 23-year-old Eric Skalnek in the face with a shotgun as Skalnek neared the entrance of Denby High School's outdoor running track. Skalnek, an aspiring police officer, was preparing to use the track in order to train for upcoming admissions testing at the Detroit Police Academy. Skalnek lost a third of his face from the blast, but survived. After shooting Skalnek, Griffin traveled to a Comerica bank where he killed three people and injured one person before he was fatally shot by police.

At one time it was known for its mathematics department which ranked high in U.S. national rankings. Rochelle Riley of the Detroit Free Press wrote that by 2010 Denby was "known more for its academic decline than" for the said mathematics department.

By 2010 Kenyetta "K.C." Wilbourn-Snapp began her term as principal of Denby. Wilbourn, who was called the "female Joe Clark", was known for carrying a baseball bat which she called the "equalizer", ever since she witnessed the beating death of a student at Finney High School on April 12, 2007 while serving as that school's assistant principal. In 2016, Wilbourn-Snapp pleaded guilty to felony charges of bribery conspiracy and tax evasion for her role in a kickback scheme during her time at Denby.

In 2011, the school completed an $16.5 Million renovation to restore the 1930s auditorium and construct new student meeting areas. The same year, Denby was transferred from Detroit Public School System (DPS) to the Education Achievement Authority (EAA). There was subsequently significant turnover of department heads and school leadership, which cycled through three principals between 2012 and 2015. Denby returned to the DPS system upon dissolution of the EAA in 2017. The principal of Denby since 2015 has been Tanisha Manningham.

== Description ==
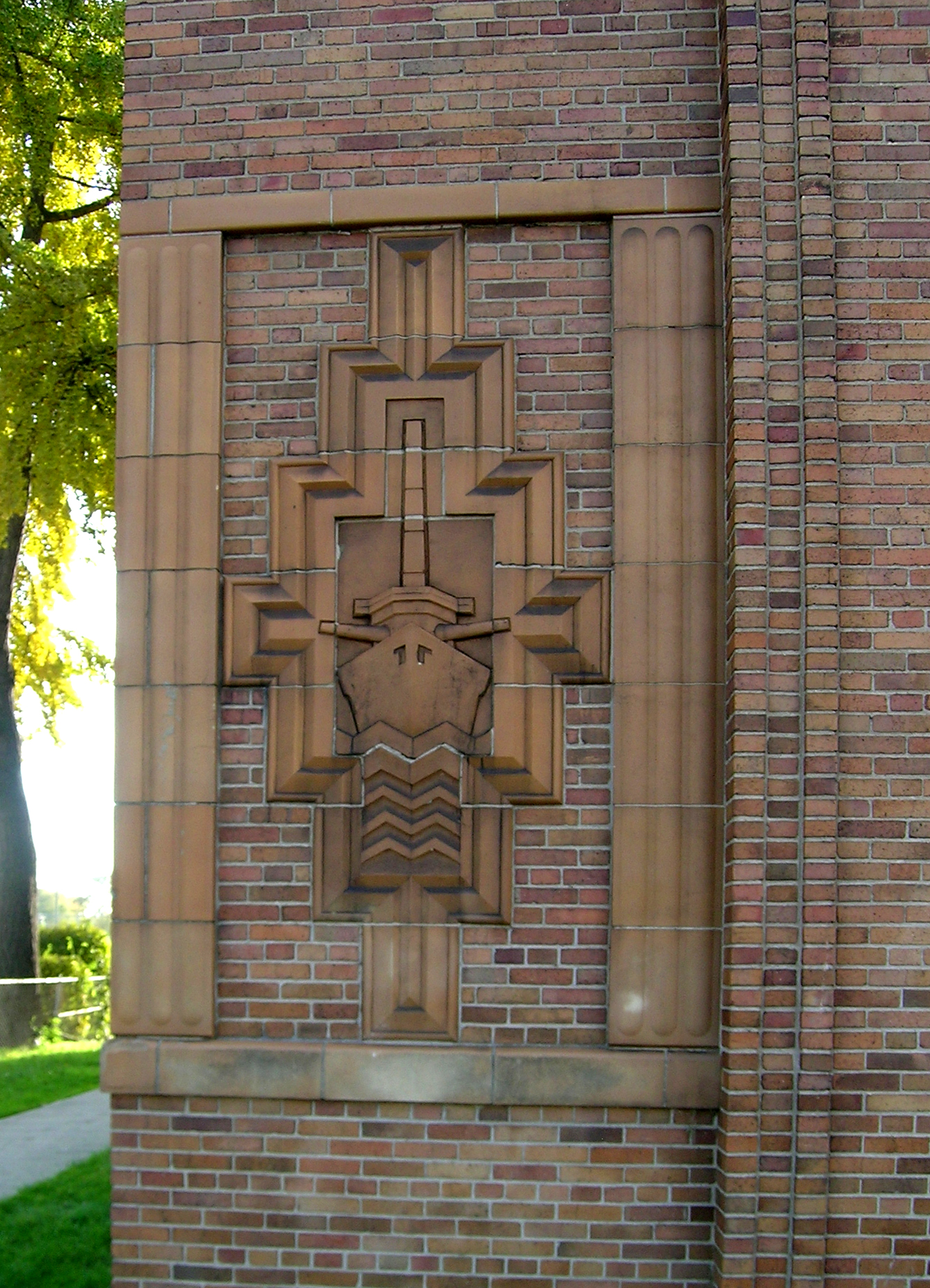
Tile relief decorative element at exterior portal

The original 1929/1930 Denby High School building is a symmetrical three-story multi-colored brick structure measuring 391 feet long by 117 feet wide. The middle section of the facade is sheathed in concrete, and each half of the building features a concrete-sheathed entrance and a projecting wing. Art Deco stylistic elements are applied to the facade of the building; these include terra cotta panels with ship and lamp reliefs, designed and made by sculptor Corrado Parducci.

The Parducci tiles include two types of reliefs used repeatedly throughout the facade. The first is a relief of a lamp with a flame which symbolizes the lamp of knowledge. The tile includes chevrons and zigzags above and below the lamp. The second is a relief of a warship, symbolizing the naval background of Edwin Denby. Two guns extend from the ship, below which are zigzags representing waves.

The front facade includes strong vertical and horizontal lines. The center of the facade is arranged into seven vertical sections, with the central bays projecting slightly farther than outer ones. Terra cotta tiles appear between windows, accentuating the vertical lines, and above and below, accentuating the horizontal. In addition to the Parducci tiles, other decorative elements include arches at the top of the stairwell windows, a small roof parapet, and checkerboard brick patterns in the middle section of the building.

The 1939 addition to the rear of the building, measuring 232 feet long by 196 feet wide, is also three stories, and the design is compatible with the original construction. The addition has the same terra cotta tiles around and between windows and concrete surrounding stairwell windows on the sides of the building. However, the terra cotta tiles on the original building do not appear on the addition.

On the interior, the floors of the hallways and stairwells are originally terrazzo covered. Brownish tiles cover the walls to a height of seven feet, and lockers line much of the walls. Classrooms generally have original wood doors and cabinetry.

== Demographics ==
The demographic breakdown of the 725 students enrolled for the 2013–2014 school year was as follows:

- Male – 50.0%
- Female – 50.0%
- Native American/Alaskan – 0.0%
- Asian/Pacific islander – 0.2%
- Black – 99.2%
- Hispanic – 0.0%
- White – 0.6%

== Notable alumni ==
- Victor Alexander, professional basketball player
- Bill Bonds, Detroit TV news anchorman
- Ed Budde, offensive guard for Super Bowl IV champion Kansas City Chiefs
- Wally Cox, actor
- Wayne Dyer, author and speaker
- Antonio Granger, professional basketball player
- Julie Harris, (attended) movie and television actress
- Curtis Hertel, politician
- Dennis M. Hertel, U.S. Congressional representative from Michigan
- John C. Hertel, politician
- Jerry Hodak, Detroit TV personality
- Nancy Milio, academic
- Len Okrie, MLB catcher and coach
- Shantee Orr, NFL player
- Willie Osley, NFL player
- Ronnie Phillips, Track
- Carmella Sabaugh, politician
- John Schubeck, national news broadcaster and top amateur golfer
- Donnie Simpson, entertainer
- Dave Soutar, former professional bowler
- Jack Van Impe, religious broadcaster
- Keith Washington, r&b singer
- Roger Young, Olympic athlete
- Sheila Young, winner of three Olympic medals in speed skating, three world championships in cycling
- 42 Dugg, rapper (drop out)
