= WADL (TV) =

Television station in Mount Clemens, Michigan

- Mount Clemens–Detroit, Michigan; United States
- City: Mount Clemens, Michigan
- Channels: Digital: 27 (UHF); Virtual: 38
- Branding: WADL My38 Detroit

Programming
- Affiliations: 38.1: Independent with MyNetworkTV; for others, see § Subchannels

Ownership
- Owner: Adell Broadcasting Corporation
- Sister stations: WFDF, The Word Network

History
- Founded: September 25, 1985
- First air date: May 20, 1989
- Former channel numbers: Analog: 38 (UHF, 1989–2009); Digital: 39 (UHF, 2000–2020)
- Former affiliations: Independent (1989–2021); CBS (secondary, 1992–2002); Fox Kids (1998–2002); NBC (secondary, 1999–2002, 2013–2014); FoxBox (2002–2003); The CW (September–October 2023)
- Call sign meaning: Adell Broadcasting

Technical information
- Licensing authority: FCC
- Facility ID: 455
- ERP: 605 kW
- HAAT: 187 m (614 ft)
- Transmitter coordinates: 42°33′15″N 82°53′15″W

Links
- Public license information: Public file; LMS
- Website: www.mywadl.com

WADL (channel 38) is a television station licensed to Mount Clemens, Michigan, United States, serving the Detroit area. It is programmed primarily as an independent station, but maintains a secondary affiliation with MyNetworkTV. Locally owned by Kevin Adell via his company Adell Broadcasting, the station maintains studios and transmitter facilities on 15 Mile Road in Clinton Township. Adell's sister company, Adell Radio Group, owns WFDF, a talk radio station in the same market, as well as religious broadcaster The Word Network.

WADL's transmitter tower is shorter and located farther east than the market's other major stations; as a result, its broadcasting radius does not reach the western and southwestern portions of the Detroit metro, and its over-the-air signal is marginal in Windsor and Essex County, Ontario, Canada. Therefore, the station relies on cable and satellite carriage to reach the entire market.

== History ==
=== Early history ===
Although Adell Broadcasting filed for an application for the channel 38 license on September 25, 1985, it took four years for WADL to begin broadcasting, signing on the air for the first time on May 20, 1989. The station was founded by Franklin Z. Adell, previously the owner of an automotive parts supplier company. His son Kevin Adell joined the company after graduating from Arizona State University in 1988. Its original programming blocks were filled with mostly Home Shopping Network programs, religious shows and other paid programming, classic movies and hourly blocks of the syndicated music video show Hit Video USA. In 1990, it began running several hours of syndicated programs.

In 1992, channel 38 began running CBS shows that were preempted by that network's then-affiliate WJBK-TV (channel 2). Despite its relationship with WJBK, WADL was barely competitive in the ratings at first. Most of the stronger syndicated programs had been acquired by Fox affiliate WKBD-TV (channel 50; which, for all intents and purposes, was programmed as an independent as Fox did not carry a full week's worth of programming until 1993) and fellow independent station WXON (channel 20, now WMYD). There simply was not enough programming to go around, even for a market as large as Detroit. Channel 38 faced an additional problem in the form of CBC-owned CBET (channel 9) in Windsor, which owned the Detroit market rights to other syndicated programs. It relied mostly on paid programming; the few entertainment shows seen on WADL's schedule consisted of barter programming.

In May 1994, WJBK's then-owner, New World Communications signed a groupwide deal with Fox to switch the network affiliations of twelve of the company's 14 stations to Fox (two of which New World would sell to Fox outright as it could not keep them due to ownership conflicts). One of the stations due to switch was WJBK. CBS approached three of Detroit's major stations—WXYZ-TV (channel 7, which renewed its ABC affiliation), WKBD, and WXON—all of which turned CBS down; WDIV-TV was eliminated as a possibility due to the station's long-term affiliation contract with NBC. Fearing it would be left without an affiliate in Detroit, CBS began talks with WADL. As a measure of how desperate CBS was at the time, it approached WADL even though most Detroit-area viewers didn't even know the station existed. However, Franklin Adell and CBS could not come to a mutual agreement, due to what CBS called unreasonable demands on Adell's part. CBS eventually bought Detroit's other low-profile independent, WGPR-TV (channel 62), changing its calls to WWJ-TV and moved the network's programming there on December 11, 1994, months before its purchase was finalized.

On August 31, 1998, WADL began carrying children's programming from Fox Kids (later FoxBox and 4KidsTV), after picking up the rights to the block from then-UPN affiliate WKBD, which had continued to air the Fox Kids weekday and Saturday blocks even after losing its Fox affiliation to WJBK. The station also acquired several syndicated children's programs. After Fox discontinued the Fox Kids weekday block in 2002, WADL continued running the revamped Fox Box until the fall of 2003, when Fox's 4Kids TV Saturday morning block moved to then-WB affiliate WDWB (later MyNetworkTV affiliate WMYD). During this time, until October 2007, WADL was the only other station besides WKBD and WMYD to continuously air children's programming. From the program's 1999 debut until 2002, WADL also broadcast the NBC daytime soap opera Passions, which WDIV originally declined to broadcast, before adding the serial to its schedule in the fall of 2002.

=== Breakthrough ===
In September 2007, WADL began to cement its standing as a major player among the Detroit market's television stations with the acquisition of popular syndicated shows, including older series such as The Nanny, Mad About You, The Jeffersons and Good Times; the station also kept many religious programs and a few infomercials as well, and eliminated the remaining animated shows. Over the years, WADL began positioning itself as being a voice of Detroit's urban community, with local programs including a weekly feature with the Mayor of Detroit and former player for the Detroit Pistons, Dave Bing.

In the fall of 2007, WADL was relaunched as "Detroit's Urban Station" to appeal to the African-American community (much as the old WGPR-TV did) and acquired syndicated programs such as The Fresh Prince of Bel-Air, American Chopper, Reno 911!, The Montel Williams Show, In the Heat of the Night, Chappelle's Show, A Different World, Magnum, P.I. and Sanford and Son. In 2009, the station added classic television series such as The Brady Bunch, I Love Lucy, Happy Days, M*A*S*H, The Jeffersons and Laverne and Shirley to its schedule. By this time, WADL began running a mix of both recent and older syndicated programs. WADL also increased its local public affairs programming with shows such as Real Talk (hosted by political activist Rev. Horace Sheffield). WADL has further cemented its presence in the community, broadcasting political debates with all candidates and inviting the community to attend.

On June 18, 2014, WADL named broadcasting veteran David Bangura as its new president; Bangura had formerly held a similar position at WMYD, which was later sold to the E. W. Scripps Company, owner of WXYZ-TV.

On July 9, 2021, it was announced that WADL would become the new MyNetworkTV affiliate for the Detroit market beginning September 20, replacing WMYD.

=== Short-lived CW affiliation; canceled sale to Mission Broadcasting ===
CW38 WADL Detroit logo, used in 2023.

On May 17, 2023, Adell Broadcasting announced it would sell WADL to Mission Broadcasting in a deal valued at $75 million. As is typical with Mission Broadcasting stations, Nexstar Media Group would both finance the deal and completely operate WADL, through a shared services agreement (SSA), if the deal closes. The deal faced a number of objections by various public interest groups, who argue that allowing Mission to acquire WADL will allow Nexstar to demand higher fees for the station and permit Nexstar to operate stations above the federal ownership cap.

On August 23, 2023, WADL announced on its website that the station was joining The CW on a primary basis, with MyNetworkTV programming airing afterwards from 10 p.m. to midnight, effective September 1.

On October 30, 2023, the station posted a press release noting it had dropped The CW over a dispute with Nexstar, claiming the sale would not be approved in the near future, with MyNetworkTV programming reverting to its prime time berth. The Detroit News reported the conflict was over Nexstar asking for a transitional affiliation agreement being signed by Adell before the station came under Mission ownership; owner Kevin Adell told a trade publication that WADL was running CW programming as an "accommodation", that he was seeking payments from Nexstar as part of any affiliation agreement, and that he had "more options to put other programming" on the station. Nexstar and The CW signed an affiliation agreement with the E. W. Scripps Company-owned WMYD, which was announced on November 6 and took effect on November 13, leading Adell to send a cease and desist letter to Scripps with the intention to stop The CW's agreement with Scripps from going into effect. Adell claimed Scripps conspired with Nexstar to harm WADL's business and to interfere with the Mission acquisition.

Despite several months of meeting with the FCC and support from groups like the Detroit chapter of the NAACP and the Rainbow Push Coalition, Adell Broadcasting owner Kevin Adell admitted the first week of April 2024 that his pending transaction with Mission and Nexstar was likely not going to get approved. The affirmation came after the FCC levied a substantial fine against Mission and Nexstar over the latter's operational control of New York–based WPIX, which was operated through a local marketing agreement similar to one that Mission would have engaged in shortly after the sale of WADL closed.

On April 23, 2024, however, Kevin Adell announced that FCC had given approval of Mission's application to purchase WADL, but the commission imposed conditions on the deal, namely that Nexstar cannot be involved in financing Mission's purchase of the station, and any SSA between Mission and Nexstar must provide limited performance bonuses and ad revenues to Nexstar, and that any SSA cannot include an option for Nexstar to purchase WADL outright. Though Kevin Adell indicated that Mission called the purchase conditions "problematic", he was optimistic that a sale to Mission would still go through. The sale was called off on May 22, 2024, after Mission filed a non-consummation notice with the FCC.

Adell announced another attempt to sell the station in September 2024, stating he had lost interest in the media business, which he did not consider a "fair fight".

== Programming ==
On June 24, 2013, WADL televised Game 6 of the Stanley Cup Final to allow Detroit's NBC station, WDIV-TV, to televise the local annual Target Fireworks show. Through 2014, NBC established a relationship with WADL that provided airing programming that local TV station WDIV could not carry. This was an opportunity for WADL to air first-run NBC programming such as Grimm, the Macy's Thanksgiving Day Parade, Growing Up Fisher, Kathie Lee and Hoda, The Michael J. Fox Show and Revolution.

Beginning in August 2015, WADL was sub-contracted by Fox Television Stations to carry Fox prime time programming preempted by WJBK during their coverage of Detroit Lions preseason football; in August 2016, by coincidence, the Lions displaced a Major League Baseball game scheduled at the last minute by Fox between the New York Yankees and Tampa Bay Rays, as it was the last game Alex Rodriguez would play in.

=== Newscasts ===
In June 1990, WADL began airing a same-night rebroadcast of WJBK's 5 p.m. and 6 p.m. newscasts, typically airing in prime time at 8 p.m., and simulcasting the 11 p.m. newscast; this continued until that station switched from CBS to Fox in December 1994.

On January 5, 2012, WADL announced that it would debut half-hour newscasts at noon and 9 p.m. on weekdays, which were produced by the Journal Register Company (owners of The Macomb Daily, Oakland Press and Southgate News-Herald), in association with the Independent News Network. The station canceled the noon and 9 p.m. newscasts after only four months on May 23, 2012, filling the time slots with syndicated programming. In June 2012, WADL began producing daily five-minute local news updates airing four times each day during the evening hours, with an hour-long national news program supplied by Newsmax TV, at 9 p.m. on weekdays.

On January 17, 2020, WADL announced that WJR fill-in host and former WDIV-TV reporter Kevin Dietz had joined the station to host a 10 p.m. news program, News Now with Kevin Dietz, to premiere on January 21. Owner Kevin Adell stated that the program would feature longer, in-depth segments focused on local and state politics, and would not directly compete with the newscasts on WJBK, WXYZ-TV, WKBD-TV, and WDIV; Dietz said that News Now would feature two-to-three stories per night and incorporate live interviews and talk radio-style call-ins, including appearances by local print journalists. The launch of News Now coincided with the debut of a nightly newscast on WKBD-TV the following night, along with the 2020 presidential election; Adell noted that there were "a lot of political dollars", some of which he intended to collect with the new program.

== Technical information ==
=== Subchannels ===
The station's signal is multiplexed:

Subchannels of WADL
Subchannel	Res.	Short name	Programming
38.1	1080i	WADL-HD	MyNetworkTV
38.2	480i	CBNNews	CBN News
38.3	480i	Quest	Quest
38.4	480i	MVSGLD	MovieSphere Gold
38.5	480i	JTV	Jewelry TV
38.6	480i	Crime	True Crime Network
38.7	480i	HSN	HSN
38.8	480i	WORD	The Word Network

When WADL initially started digital broadcasting, Universal Sports was carried on 38.2, and The Word Network was carried on 38.3. Antenna TV was added to 38.2 in 2011, moving Universal Sports to 38.4, until it became pay TV-exclusive in 2012. Antenna TV was removed from WADL's lineup in September 2015.

=== Analog-to-digital conversion ===
WADL shut down its analog signal, over UHF channel 38, on June 12, 2009, the official date on which full-power television stations in the United States transitioned from analog to digital broadcasts under federal mandate. The station's digital signal continued to broadcast on its pre-transition UHF channel 39, using virtual channel 38.

=== FCC spectrum auction and attempted WADL sale ===
In 2012, the Federal Communications Commission (FCC) announced it would hold a voluntary incentive auction for a portion of the radio frequency spectrum that is currently used by television broadcasters across the country. In 2014, WADL owner Kevin Adell announced he would participate in the auction, since it was estimated the station would net somewhere in the range of $170 million, much more than it would be worth on the open market otherwise. Since that time, the auction estimate had increased to somewhere between $360–$380 million.

Adell would continue to own and operate The Word Network. WADL's broadcast facilities would have been re-purposed for The Word Network, along with the transfer of roughly 33 WADL staffers.

WADL was ultimately not sold in the auction, which concluded in 2017.

Due to the COVID-19 pandemic, the FCC allowed some stations in Phase 8 (ending March 13, 2020) of their 600-MHz spectrum auction to delay their move to Phase 9 (ending May 1, 2020) on an as-needed basis. As a result, WADL was granted permission to delay being relocated to Phase 9, and moved from UHF 39 to UHF 27 on March 23, 2020.

== Cable coverage in Canada ==
WADL and its The Word Network digital subchannel are carried on GosfieldTel in Essex County, Ontario, as well as Cogeco systems in some rural areas of Southwestern Ontario, primarily in areas formerly served by other cable providers that were purchased by Cogeco around 2000. It is not carried on Cogeco systems in Windsor.

== See also ==
- Media in Detroit
