= WFDF =

WFDF may refer to:

- WFDF (AM) (910 AM), talk formatted broadcast radio station licensed to Farmington Hills, Michigan
- World Flying Disc Federation, the international governing body for flying disc sports
- Wet feet, dry feet policy, the United States policy regarding Cuban immigration
