= Broadcast House (Michigan) =

Television and radio studio and corporate office located in Southfield, Michigan

- Interactive map of the Broadcast House area

General information
- Type: Film, radio, and television production studio Corporate offices
- Location: 20777 W. 10 Mile Road; Southfield, Michigan; 48037
- Coordinates: 42.469116°N 83.248291°W
- Opening: 1959
- Owner: E.W. Scripps Company

The Broadcast House, also referred to as the WXYZ-TV Broadcast House, is a television and radio production studio complex located in Southfield, Michigan near the campus of Lawrence Technological University. The complex houses production and broadcasting facilities for WXYZ-TV, WMYD-TV, WFDF, and The Word Network.

== History ==
In 1959, all of WXYZ's radio and television operations moved into new broadcast facilities at Broadcast House, at 20777 West Ten Mile Road in Southfield, where WXYZ's television operations remain. The facility was built on the site of a former farm and included three television production studios and its own free-standing broadcast tower with a single-person maintenance elevator. WXYZ began broadcasting network programs in color in 1962 and started broadcasting local programs and newscasts in color around 1964.

In the 1960s, a full transmitter facility was built at the Broadcast House intended for WJMY-TV which was on channel 20 but had ceased transmission in 1963. In 1975, WXON, later WMYD, relocated its studios to the Broadcast House after returning to the airwaves in 1972.

In 1993, the studios held the first Town Meeting with President Bill Clinton hosted by WXYZ-TV anchorman Bill Bonds in which the President of the United States would address questions from audience members at the studios as well as audiences at other television stations via satellite.

In 2000, the studios became the headquarters for The Word Network and in 2012, the network expanded its operations to a state-of-the-art television production facility inside the complex which serves as its current global headquarters.
