= The Word Network =

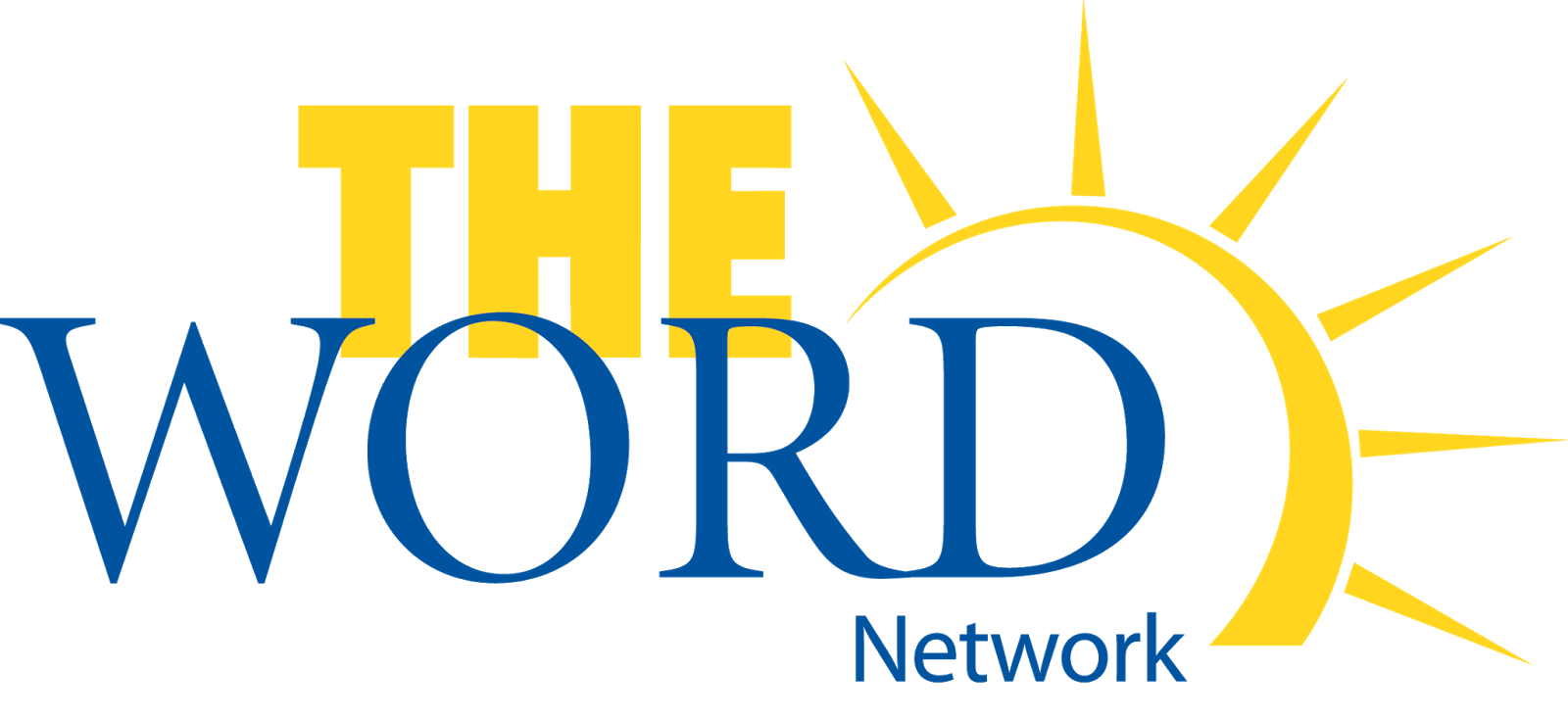
- Type: Religious broadcasting
- Country: United States
- Broadcast area: Worldwide

Programming
- Language: English

Ownership
- Owner: Adell Broadcasting Corporation
- Key people: Kevin Adell (CEO); Ralph Lameti (CFO)

History
- Launched: 2000

Links
- Website: www.thewordnetwork.org

Availability

Terrestrial
- Zuku TV (Kenya): Channel 899

The Word Network, also known as The Word, is a religious broadcasting network that claims to be the largest African-American religious network in the world. It was founded in February 2000 by Kevin Adell who also owns WFDF, a local AM radio station, and WADL, a television station serving the Detroit television market. The network is headquartered at the Broadcast House in Southfield, Michigan. The network is also available as streaming content on Apple TV, Roku, Chromecast, YouTube Red, and via smartphone apps. The network is also available on cable and satellite in several countries, and on over-the-air television.

== History ==
Adell planned a national network for African-American religious ministries in the 1990s, and launched The Word Network on February 14, 2000 on DirecTV.

Following its launch, broadcast was extended to all major television cable platforms in the United States. The network then moved to satellite broadcast. The network claims that it reaches viewers in 200 countries.

In May 2012 the network completed a multimillion-dollar expansion that included new technology, production facilities with a television studio, editing suites, green rooms, conference room, a call center, and a fulfillment center. Facilities were also opened on the West Coast, in Orange, California.

In January 2015 Adell purchased former Radio Disney affiliate WFDF/910 in Detroit for $3 million.

Current over-the-air affiliates of the network are KVVV-LD Channel 15.1 in Houston, Texas, WADL Channel 38.8 in Mount Clemens, Michigan near Detroit, WBQP-CD Chantilly 12.3 in Pensacola, Florida, and WCTU-LD Channel 46.3 in Pensacola.

In 2019, the network faced boycott calls from African-American clergy after the network's white owner, Kevin Adell, shared a racially charged meme, in which Adell was depicted as a pimp surrounded by black pastors.

In 2025 the network was fined £150,000 in the UK for broadcasting programming by televangelist Peter Popoff selling "miracle spring water" claimed to cure serious illnesses and produce financial benefits. This was considered to be a serious breach of the UK Broadcasting Code by regulator Ofcom, which "considered that these claims related to viewers' health and wealth and such claims had the potential to cause harm".

== Programming ==
The Word Network provides religious programming shows and hosts that include:

- Let the Healing Begin – Bishop Greg Davis
- The Heather Lindsey Show – Heather Lindsey
- The Shift – Dr. Taketa Williams
- The Tim and Brelyn Show-Tim & Brelyn Bowman
- The Empowerment Encounter-Dr. Jamal Bryant
- The Gospel According to Dorinda-Dorinda Clark Cole
- Man up-KD Bowe
- Power to the People-Dr. Jamal Bryant
- Rising Stars with Dorinda-Dorinda Clark Cole
- The First Word and Rejoice in The Word-Bishop George Bloomer
- Greg Davis Live-Bishop Greg Davis
- Medina Pullings Live-Dr. Medina Pullings
- The Breaking Room-Dr. Zina Pierre
- Fresh Wind-Evangelist Sandra Riley
- Prophetic Power-Prophetess Teresa Cox
- The Threshing Floor-Dr. Juanita Bynum
- Word Network Church- Lexi Allen
- Dr. Mark Chironna-Dr. Mark Chironna
- The Miraculous- Prophet Brian Carn
- Spiritual Encounter-Vangelist Neechy
- Just for You-Evangelist Sandra Riley
- Straight To the Point with Rev. W.J. Rideout
- You're Season of Change with David Alexander Bullock
- Coming Home with Gerald & Tammi & Friends-Gerald & Tammi Haddon
- Your Time for Miracles with Bishop Clarence McClendon
- Kingdom Come TV with Rev. Timothy Flemming Sr.
- The Breaking Room with Dr. Zina Pierre
- Breath of Life-Pastor Debleaire Snell
- The Millennial Meal-Que Morgan and Micah Davis

In addition to its original programming, The Word Network also participates in religious conference and conventions that include the Pentecostal Assemblies of the World, Inc.-P.A.W., Full Gospel Conference, Church of God in Christ Holy Convocation, and “7 Last Words” hosted by Dr. Jamal Bryant. The network also broadcasts the Gospel Music Awards, produced by Sunwise Media.
