= Steve Wilson (reporter) =

American news reporter

Steve Wilson is an American news reporter. Currently running his own nonprofit investigative reporting group, he is best known for his whistleblower lawsuit with then-wife Jane Akre against WTVT in 1997 and his work as WXYZ-TV's Chief Investigative Reporter in Detroit, Michigan in the late 2000s.

== Professional life ==
Wilson began his news career offering investigative news reports to various outlets in the 1980s. His reports were aired by CBS and ABC affiliates, and eventually led to Wilson joining Inside Edition, a nationally syndicated tabloid program. He would stay with Inside Edition for more than five years, and many of his reports won Emmy Awards for consumer reporting.

Wilson met his future wife, Jane Akre, at a journalism convention in Washington. The two later moved to South Florida and eventually to Tampa, where they joined WTVT, the local Fox owned-and-operated television station.

=== WTVT Whistleblower lawsuit ===
In 1997, Wilson and Akre began work on a story regarding the agricultural biotechnology company Monsanto and recombinant bovine growth hormone (rBGH), a milk additive that had been approved for use by the Food and Drug Administration but also blamed for a number of health issues. Wilson and Akre planned a four-part investigative report on Monsanto's use of rBGH, which prompted Monsanto to write to Roger Ailes, president of Fox News Channel, in an attempt to have the report reviewed for bias and because of the "enormous damage that can be done" as a result of the report.

WTVT chose not to run the report, and they would later argue in court that the report was not "breakthrough journalism". Wilson and Akre then claimed that Monsanto's actions constituted the news broadcast telling lies, while WTVT countered looking only for fairness. According to Wilson and Akre, the two rewrote the report over 83 times over the course of 1997, and WTVT decided to exercise "its option to terminate their employment contracts without cause," and did not renew their contracts in 1998. WTVT would later run a report about Monsanto and rBGH in 1998, and the report included defenses from Monsanto.

When their contracts were not renewed, Wilson and Akre filed a lawsuit concerning WTVT's "news distortion" under Florida's whistleblower laws, claiming their termination was retaliation for "resisting WTVT's attempts to distort or suppress the BGH story." In a joint statement, Wilson claimed that he and Akre "were repeatedly ordered to go forward and broadcast demonstrably inaccurate and dishonest versions of the story," and "were given those instructions after some very high-level corporate lobbying by Monsanto (the powerful drug company that makes the hormone) and also ... by members of Florida’s dairy and grocery industries." The trial commenced in summer 2000 with a jury dismissing all of the claims brought to trial by Wilson, but siding with one aspect of Akre's complaint, awarding Akre $425000 and agreeing that Akre was a whistleblower because she believed there were violations of the 1934 Federal Communications Act and that she planned on reporting WTVT to the Federal Communications Commission. Akre's argument in the trial was that they did not have to prove actual news distortion, but that they instead believed such distortion occurred.

An appeal was filed, and a ruling in February 2003 came down in favor of WTVT, who successfully argued that the FCC policy against falsification was not a "law, rule, or regulation", and so the whistle-blower law did not qualify as the required "law, rule, or regulation" under section 448.102. ... Because the FCC's news distortion policy is not a "law, rule, or regulation" under section 448.102, Akre has failed to state a claim under the whistle-blower's statute." The appeal did not address any falsification claims, noting that "as a threshold matter ... Akre failed to state a claim under the whistle-blower's statute," but noted that the lower court ruled against all of Wilson's charges and all of Akre's claims with the exception of the whistleblower claim that was overturned.

Wilson and Akre became popular among many media outlets. The 2003 documentary The Corporation featured Wilson and Akre discussing their battle with WTVT, with Wilson claiming that the jury "determined that the story they pressured us to broadcast, the story we resisted telling, was in fact false, distorted, or slanted." Project Censored called their story one of the "Most Censored Stories" of 2003, claiming that the "Court Ruled That the Media Can Legally Lie." Robert F. Kennedy Jr. later quoted Wilson in his book, Crimes Against Nature, with Wilson asking "[W]hat reporter is going to challenge a network ... if the station can retaliate by suing the reporter to oblivion the way the courts are letting them do to us?" Following the story, Akre and Wilson won the Goldman Environmental Prize for the report, as well as an Ethics in Journalism Award from the Society of Professional Journalists. The two continue to challenge WTVT's license, the last such challenge coming in 2005.

=== Kwame Kilpatrick and the Civic Fund ===
After spending some time away from the broadcast media, Wilson joined WXYZ-TV in Detroit, Michigan in 2001. In 2005, Wilson filed a report regarding the Kilpatrick Civic Fund, a fund created by Detroit mayor Kwame Kilpatrick to help improvements in education and voter empowerment. The reports continued, with the situation escalating. Kilpatrick's bodyguards shoved Wilson in one instance. Wilson also followed Kilpatrick around the country, at one point booking a plane ticket directly next to the Mayor in an attempt to corner him for an interview. The City of Detroit later prepared and broadcast a video attacking Wilson on its city-controlled Public-access television cable TV channel, entitled Steve Wilson, the Inventive Reporter.

=== Beyond WXYZ ===
In 2010, Wilson's contract at WXYZ was not renewed. The station's corporate management called it "a business decision." Wilson claimed he was let go "by a corporate owner who is not in this community." In a follow-up email to Detroit blogger Dave Shea, Wilson noted his intent to start a not-for-profit news organization he originally dubbed The Michigan Center for Investigative Reporting. On the day Wilson's non-profit (ultimately named The Michigan News Center) was to go live on the Internet, he suffered a massive heart attack. On life support for nearly a week, he later said he owed his life to the efforts of the cardiac team at Detroit's Henry Ford Hospital. Subsequently, Wilson left Michigan and is now retired and living on a beach in Florida and in the North Carolina mountains. He still supports non-profit journalism with contributions and volunteer efforts at Detroit-based Eye on Michigan where journalism students learn investigative reporting.
