= Robbie Timmons =

American TV news anchor/reporter

Robbie Timmons is a retired American TV news anchor/reporter for Detroit television stations WJBK-TV and WXYZ-TV. She was the first female news anchor in American history to anchor the 6:00pm and 11:00pm broadcasts in March 1973 while anchoring the news at WILX-TV in Lansing, Michigan. After four years at WILX-TV in Lansing, she was offered a job working as a reporter and 11pm news anchor for WJBK-TV (CBS) in Detroit, where she worked for six years. In 1982 Timmons accepted a news anchor position for WXYZ-TV, the ABC affiliate in Detroit where she received numerous honors including Emmy Awards and the distinction of being named one of the most powerful women in Michigan. Robbie Timmons retired in October 2010 and is currently an officer of a non-profit Thoroughbred retraining organization, CANTER.

== Personal life and career ==
Timmons was born in Columbus, Ohio, attended Ohio State University, studying Business Administration. She had a passion for television journalism and reporting. She wrote and produced TV commercials. In 1972 she interviewed for a TV News reporter/anchor position at WILX-TV in Lansing. Two weeks later she was on television as a reporter.

While working at WILX-TV as a news anchor/reporter she worked with sportscaster Jim Brandstatter, whom she later married. In 1976 WILX sent Timmons to Washington D.C. to cover President Gerald Ford's address to television news directors at the White House. Timmons was experienced in setting up and operating video cameras and after videotaping the president's address, she hoped to get an interview with him. She took advantage of an opportunity to grab Ford's attention by saying "Go Blue", as he approached. She knew that President Ford had played football at the University of Michigan, and was an avid alumnus. The president smiled, and gave Timmons an exclusive interview. The TV news director for CBS affiliate in Detroit saw Robbie get the exclusive interview and was so impressed he scheduled an interview with Timmons. Three weeks later she was the anchor for WJBK-TV for the 11:00pm news.

As Timmons career as a news anchor in Detroit took off, Jim Brandstatter began working in the Sports Department of WDIV-TV in Detroit. They were married in 1980.

Timmons has six Emmy awards for reporting and anchoring, two Silver Circle awards, and in 2013 was enshrined in the Michigan Association of Broadcaster's Hall of Fame.

In 1998 Timmons began volunteering for CANTER, a non-profit all volunteer organization that retrains non-competitive thoroughbred race horses for new careers as sport horses or trail horses. She began volunteering full-time as Treasurer and currently Executive Director of CANTER after her retirement from television in 2010. Timmons wrote a popular book based on one of the thoroughbreds helped by CANTER, titled "Twoey and the Goat", in 2008.
