= Jane Akre =

American journalist

Jane Akre is an American journalist best known for the whistleblower lawsuit by herself and her former husband, Steve Wilson, against Fox station WTVT in Tampa, Florida. Akre and Wilson are featured in the 2003 documentary film The Corporation which includes a section about the same lawsuit.

== Professional life ==
Akre began her career at a small radio station as a news reporter and occasional disc jockey in 1978. She moved around the country as a news reporter and news anchor until spending some time at CNN. Following her firing from WTSP, she joined WTVT, a Fox Broadcasting Company affiliate.

Following her issues with WTVT, she took a series of jobs and was featured in The Corporation regarding her whistleblower lawsuit. In 2007 Akre became the editor-in-chief of the national news desk at InjuryBoard.com.

== Whistleblower lawsuit ==
In 1997, Wilson and Akre began work on a story regarding the agricultural biotechnology company Monsanto and recombinant bovine growth hormone (rBGH), a milk additive that had been approved for use by the Food and Drug Administration but also blamed for a number of health issues. Wilson and Akre planned a four-part investigative report on Monsanto's use of rBGH, which prompted Monsanto to write to Roger Ailes, president of Fox News Channel, in an attempt to have the report reviewed for bias and because of the "enormous damage that can be done" as a result of the report.

WTVT did not run the report, and later argued in court that the report was not "breakthrough journalism". Wilson and Akre then claimed that WTVT's actions constituted the news broadcast telling lies, while WTVT countered that it was looking only for fairness. According to Wilson and Akre, the two rewrote the report over 80 times over the course of 1997, and WTVT decided to exercise "its option to terminate their employment contracts without cause," and did not renew their contracts in 1998. WTVT later ran a report about Monsanto and rBGH in 1998, and the report included defenses from Monsanto.

When their contracts were not renewed, Wilson and Akre filed a lawsuit concerning WTVT's alleged news distortion under Florida's whistleblower laws, claiming their termination was retaliation for "resisting WTVT's attempts to distort or suppress the Monsanto recombinant bovine growth hormone story." In a joint statement, Wilson claimed that he and Akre "were repeatedly ordered to go forward and broadcast demonstrably inaccurate and dishonest versions of the story," and "were given those instructions after some very high-level corporate lobbying by Monsanto (the agriculture company that makes the hormone) and also ... by members of Florida’s dairy and grocery industries." The trial commenced in summer 2000 with a jury dismissing all of the claims brought to trial by Wilson, but siding with one aspect of Akre's complaint, awarding Akre $425,000 and agreeing that Akre was a whistleblower because she believed there were violations of the Communications Act of 1934 and because she planned on reporting WTVT to the Federal Communications Commission.

An appeal was filed, and a ruling in February 2003 came down in favor of WTVT, who successfully argued that the FCC policy against falsification was not a "law, rule, or regulation", and so the whistle-blower law did not qualify as the required "law, rule, or regulation" under section 448.102 of the Florida Statutes. ... Because the FCC's news distortion policy is not a "law, rule, or regulation" under section 448.102 of the Florida Statutes, Akre has failed to state a claim under the whistle-blower's statute." The appeal did not address any falsification claims, noting that "as a threshold matter ... Akre failed to state a claim under the whistle-blower's statute," but noted that the lower court ruled against all of Wilson's charges and all of Akre's claims with the exception of the whistleblower claim that was overturned.

The 2003 documentary, The Corporation, which was a 2 hr and 24 minute documentary, included a 10-minute section on Wilson and Akre discussing their battle with WTVT, with Wilson claiming that the jury "determined that the story they pressured us to broadcast, the story we resisted telling, was in fact false, distorted, or slanted." Project Censored called their story one of the "Most Censored Stories" of 2003, claiming that the "Court Ruled That the Media Can Legally Lie." Robert F. Kennedy Jr. later quoted Wilson in his book, Crimes Against Nature, with Wilson asking "[W]hat reporter is going to challenge a network ... if the station can retaliate by suing the reporter to oblivion the way the courts are letting them do to us?" Wilson and Kennedy both failed to note that Wilson and Akre originally brought the suit. Following the story, Akre and Wilson won the Goldman Environmental Prize for the report, as well as an Ethics in Journalism Award from the Society of Professional Journalists. The two continued to challenge WTVT's license, the last such challenge coming in 2005.

The two lost that final challenge with the FCC in July 2007 calling the conflict an "editorial dispute ... rather than a deliberate effort by [WTVT] to distort news."

== See also ==
- Journalism ethics and standards
- Journalism
