= Jerry Hodak =

American television meteorologist

Jerry Hodak (born April 11, 1942) is the former chief meteorologist on ABC's Detroit, Michigan affiliate, WXYZ-TV.

A native of Detroit, Hodak graduated from Guardian Angels Elementary School and Denby High School in Detroit, and studied mass communications at Wayne State University, also located in Detroit. After traveling to Orlando, Florida, as a news reporter for WDBO-TV, Hodak returned to Detroit in 1965 as a weathercaster for WJBK-TV on Channel 2. In 1977, Hodak joined WXYZ-TV as a science editor and weathercaster. He returned to WJBK for a 3 1/2-year stint as a news anchor from 1992 to 1996.

Along with winning a local Emmy, Hodak received the television Seal of Approval from the American Meteorological Society. Hodak was inducted into the Michigan Journalism Hall of Fame in 2010.

On September 23, 2010, Hodak retired from WXYZ-TV.
