= Johnny Ginger =

American television personality (1934–2026)

- Born: Galen Grindle; June 16, 1934; Toledo, Ohio, U.S.
- Died: July 5, 2026 (aged 92); Genoa, Ohio, U.S.
- Occupations: Actor, television personality

Galen Grindle (June 16, 1934 – July 5, 2026), better known as Johnny Ginger, was an American television presenter in Detroit.

== Life and career ==
Grindle was born in Toledo, Ohio, on June 16, 1934. His parents, Ray and Edna, were a Vaudeville family act performing at the Paramount Theater in Toledo. His brother, Kenny, was a tap dancer in the family act. One day they brought little Johnny up onstage to sing "Sonny Boy" and he was an instant hit. As a teen he performed stand-up comedy in clubs all over Toledo, Detroit, and Canada.

He worked as a comedian under the name Jerry Gale when he auditioned to present a program for WXYZ-TV based around re-runs of The Three Stooges. Given the role, WXYZ vice president John Pival insisted that he work under the name Johnny Ginger, the name taken from a bottle of Johnny Bull Ginger Beer. Ginger's afternoon show, Curtain Time Theater (which was always pronounced "Thee-A-ter"), entertained kids from 1957 to 1960 on WXYZ-TV Channel 7. The live portions of the show were broadcast all around the television station, with Ginger in his janitor costume of bib-overalls and driving cap. By the early 1960s Johnny adapted a new character inspired by the Jerry Lewis film The Bellboy, that of the head bellboy at the Rocky Plaza Hotel, run by Rocky Granet (the voice of Rube Weiss), and the show became The Johnny Ginger Show. He introduced a new generation of kids to The Three Stooges and even played the part of Billy The Kid in the Stooges last film, The Outlaws Is Coming. As a gesture of gratitude, the Stooges used many of the children's hosts who had run their shorts in the cast. He, Ricky the Clown, Jingles, Poop-Deck Paul, Milky the Clown, Rube Weiss, Captain Jolly, Sagebush Shorty and Soupy Sales helped pioneer Detroit television for children in the fifties and sixties. The Johnny Ginger Show was cancelled in 1968. Ginger went on to host Captain Detroit for WKBD-TV. He left Detroit for Hollywood and appeared on an episode of The Rifleman.

Grindle died at a senior living facility in Genoa, Ohio, on July 5, 2026, at the age of 92.
