= Nancy Milio =

American academic

Nancy Rosalie Milio, Ph.D., FAPHA, FAAN (born 1938), is Professor Emeritus of Nursing and Professor Emeritus of Health Policy and Administration, School of Public Health, University of North Carolina at Chapel Hill. Dr. Milio's career was given its foundation during her high school years in Denby High School, Detroit, Michigan. She earned her Bachelor of Science degree (B.S., Nursing, 1960) and master's degree (M.A., Sociology, 1965) at Wayne State University, Detroit, and her PhD at Yale University (dissertation title: The Career of an Innovative Project: A Study of Inter-organizational Strategies and Decision-Making Among Health Organizations).

She is a leader in public health policy and education, who originated the notion of healthy public policy which addresses the effects of all areas of public policy on health and has been adopted internationally, including by the World Health Organization.
