= Steve Handelsman =

American journalist

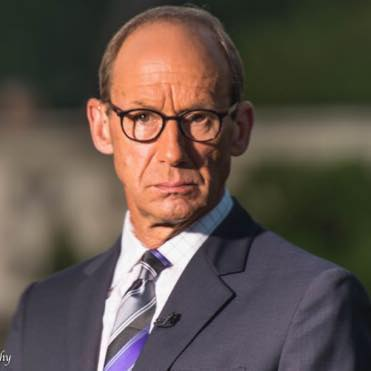
- Handelsman in 2016
- Born: December 9, 1948 (age 77); Baltimore, Maryland, US
- Education: Duke University
- Occupation: Journalist
- Spouse: Ruth E. Handelsman
- Children: 2

Stephen Hale "Steve" Handelsman (born December 9, 1948) is an American retired journalist. As a former national correspondent for NBC News, his reports were seen on many NBC stations, sometimes with him "tagging out" with the mentioning of an NBC station's general branding or newscast title, giving the impression he is a reporter for that station—whether owned and operated by NBCUniversal or just affiliated with the network—while other times stating he was from NBC News, especially on WMGM-TV. His reports also appeared on CNBC and The Weather Channel. He had filed in for Dateline NBC.

== Early years and education ==
Handelsman is a native of Baltimore and following his graduation from Duke University, he taught English and Mass Media for three years at Anacostia High School in Washington, D.C.

He is the brother of editorial cartoonist, Walt Handlesman.

== Career ==
In 1984, Handelsman began working for NBC in Washington as the first national reporter for the NBC owned stations. Prior to that, he was with WXYZ-TV in Detroit and WLWT-TV in Cincinnati.

He has received three Emmy Awards, including one in 1988 for his story "Kids on Steroids."

Some of the major domestic stories Handelsman has covered include Hurricane Katrina, Hurricane Andrew, Hurricane Hugo. Overseas, he covered The Iraq War, The Gulf War, unrest in Pakistan, Panama, the Philippines, Africa, and the Middle East, terrorist attacks in Brussels (2016) and London, the opening of the Berlin Wall, Pope John Paul II's death, and Summit conferences in Geneva, Moscow, and Iceland.

Handelsman covers national political affairs including the 2016 Presidential election. He has been assigned political coverage since 1984.

Handelsman retired in January 2017.
