= Estrous synchronization =

Method of artificial breeding

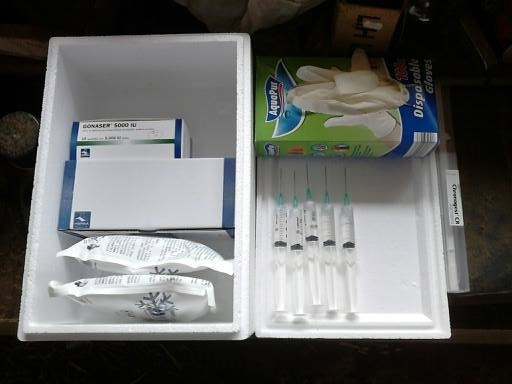

In agriculture, estrous synchronization is used (particularly in the dairy and beef industries) to facilitate breeding by artificial insemination.

== Background ==
The term “estrus” refers to the phase of the estrous cycle in which a sexually mature, non-pregnant female is receptive to sexual advances from the male. Ovulation occurs at approximately this time. Estrous synchronization is the process of targeting female mammals to come to heat within a short time frame (36 to 96 hours). This is achieved through the use of one or more hormones.

Methods to improve our ability to synchronize the reproductive process and result in the ‘timed insemination’ without the detection of heat have been developed. These include the “Synch” protocols that involve the application of GnRH (gonadotrophin-releasing hormone) and PGF2α (prostaglandin F2 alpha) in various combinations. GnRH (controls the production of eggs in cows and sperm in bulls) is a hormone produced in the hypothalamus and the gonads. PGF2α is a hormone produced in the lining of the uterus that breaks down the corpus luteum (CL) if no pregnancy has occurred. The CL produces progesterone and is a temporary structure that develops in each cycle of the cow. After PGF2α breaks down the CL, progesterone (a hormone used to maintain pregnancy) starts to drop which allows the cow to start another heat cycle and be ready to breed.

The “Synch” protocols as mentioned above may include: Select Synch, OvSynch, CoSynch, and Modified Select Synch. The synchronization of the estrous cycle is commonly used in different industries, such as Dairy and Beef cattle. Synchronization allows these industries to improve production and increase profit.

== Method ==
Research has been conducted into different ways farmers can perform estrous synchronization such as progesterone injections or a Progesterone Releasing Intra-vaginal Device [PRID]. The PRID is a sponge that is inserted into the vagina of a cow to stop the natural estrous cycle (for it acts as a corpus luteum), because progesterone is the hormone that signals the body to stop the cycle because fertilization has occurred. When the sponge is removed the cycle restarts. This apparatus is useful in manipulating the cycle so that multiple cows can be ovulated around the same time.

Other methods use injections of GnRH or PGF2α at certain points over the course of a few weeks to simulate the body’s natural production of these compounds. This is a more exact but time-consuming way to manipulate the cycle of multiple cows to sync up the timing of artificial insemination (A.I.). Estrus synchronization has major advantages in making artificial insemination more practical. Increasing the productivity of embryo transfer and A.I. is economically profitable as the costs associated with veterinarian and semen services are reduced.

Embryo transfer is a very efficient method that allows farmers to get several calves from one specific cow over her lifetime as long as she is healthy and still producing eggs. If that cow has very good genetics then the farmers make a higher profit from her calves. A.I. and embryo transfer decrease costs because the period of ovulation of the herd decreases to 2-5 days, so vets are required for less time to inseminate cows. There are many different injection methods that have been put into practice in order to manipulate the estrous cycle. These involve injections into each cow with a measured amount of progesterone or progestin and waiting 5-7 days, or until heat signals occur, before moving onto different impregnating methods such as joining the cows or heifers with a bull.

Heat detection in cattle is very important, and the most accurate way to determine if cows are in heat is watching them in the mornings and evenings for at least 45 minutes. If a cow is mounted by another and doesn't run away this is called standing heat. If this occurs in the morning then she should be artificially inseminated that evening. If this standing heat occurs in the evening then she should be artificially inseminated the next morning because the window for a successful insemination is so short.

== Agricultural applications ==
Milk is a product of great demand all year round. As a result of this demand, farmers have been given an incentive to produce milk during winter months. In order to achieve this public demand for milk, dairy farmers needed to change their breeding routines. Estrous synchronization enabled this change in the herd’s breeding routine to allow dairy farmers to produce milk for human consumption year round.

Case studies for the productivity of these incentives on dairy farms have shown to have positive results. Estrus synchronization has proven to have many advantages in the dairy and beef industries. Estrous synchronization also allows for multiple cows to be A.I. at the same time which is more cost efficient for farmers. Estrous synchronization has shown many benefits for producers, including having several calves born within a short time frame. Calves born around the same time tend to have a similar weight, which increases their value when being sold on the market. Synchronizing cows can promote good herd genetics by enabling several cows to be bred to top tier bulls.

The application of estrous synchronization enables the farmer to reduce costs involved in the hire of animal insemination technicians and semen import. Concentrated calving and uniform weaning saves time and is cheaper than having individual cows in heat throughout the year. However, there are also disadvantages with estrous synchronization. It requires a high level of management and skills to be able to manage numerous calving operations at a synchronized time. Furthermore, maintaining nutrition and herd health are major factors when it comes to the achieving optimum reproductive performance through estrous synchronization.
