= WFRO (AM) =

Radio station in Fremont, Ohio (1949–2004)

- Fremont, Ohio; United States
- Broadcast area: Sandusky/Port Clinton; Lake Erie Islands
- Frequency: 900 kHz

Ownership
- Owner: ABC, Inc. (Disney); (Radio Disney Group, LLC)
- Operator: BAS Broadcasting
- Sister stations: WFRO-FM

History
- First air date: 1949
- Last air date: June 23, 2004
- Call sign meaning: Fremont

Technical information
- Facility ID: 73387
- Class: B
- Power: 500 watts (daytime); 287 watts (nighttime)
- Transmitter coordinates: 41°19′35″N 83°5′4″W

WFRO was a radio station licensed to Fremont, Ohio, United States, to operate on 900 kHz. It signed off June 23, 2004 to allow WFDF (910 AM) to increase power. WFRO's programming was at times simulcast on WFRO-FM, which continues.

== History ==
For much of its existence, WFRO had been a combination AM and FM station, with FM first going on the air in 1946, and AM (at 900 kHz) going on the air three years later. Both stations simulcast each other for a portion of the broadcast day, breaking away for separate programming during the midday hours, with AM concentrating more on information and talk, and FM focusing on music.

For many years, WFRO AM broadcast a full-service MOR format heavy on local news and information; WFRO-FM played beautiful music during non-simulcast dayparts. AM 900's directional signal allowed WFRO programming to be heard clearly throughout much of southeastern Michigan (including the metropolitan Detroit area) and southwestern Ontario in addition to Ohio's North Coast region. By the 1990s, WFRO and WFRO-FM were simulcasting each other for most of the broadcast day, and WFRO's music format had evolved into a more contemporary mix of AC and adult-appeal CHR hits, but the full-service emphasis remained.

The station was founded by Wolfe Broadcasting Company, which controlled the station until 2001, when both stations were sold separately to two different owners.

BAS Broadcasting purchased WFRO-FM, while Disney/ABC purchased the license to WFRO, but not to run it as a separate entity. ABC purchased the license as part of an initiative to move recently purchased AM 910 WFDF in Flint, Michigan to Farmington Hills (in the Detroit market). The move was made to allow AM 910 to broadcast at an increased daytime power of 50,000 watts, up substantially from 5,000 watts. WFRO-FM changed to the satellite adult contemporary format it currently airs, and WFRO, after a brief period of silence, returned to the air using ABC's "Real Country" format and then ESPN Radio while preparations for WFDF's move into the Detroit area were made. WFRO was officially silenced forever in June 2004 when ABC surrendered the license to the FCC.
