= WFDF (AM) =

Radio station in Farmington Hills, Michigan

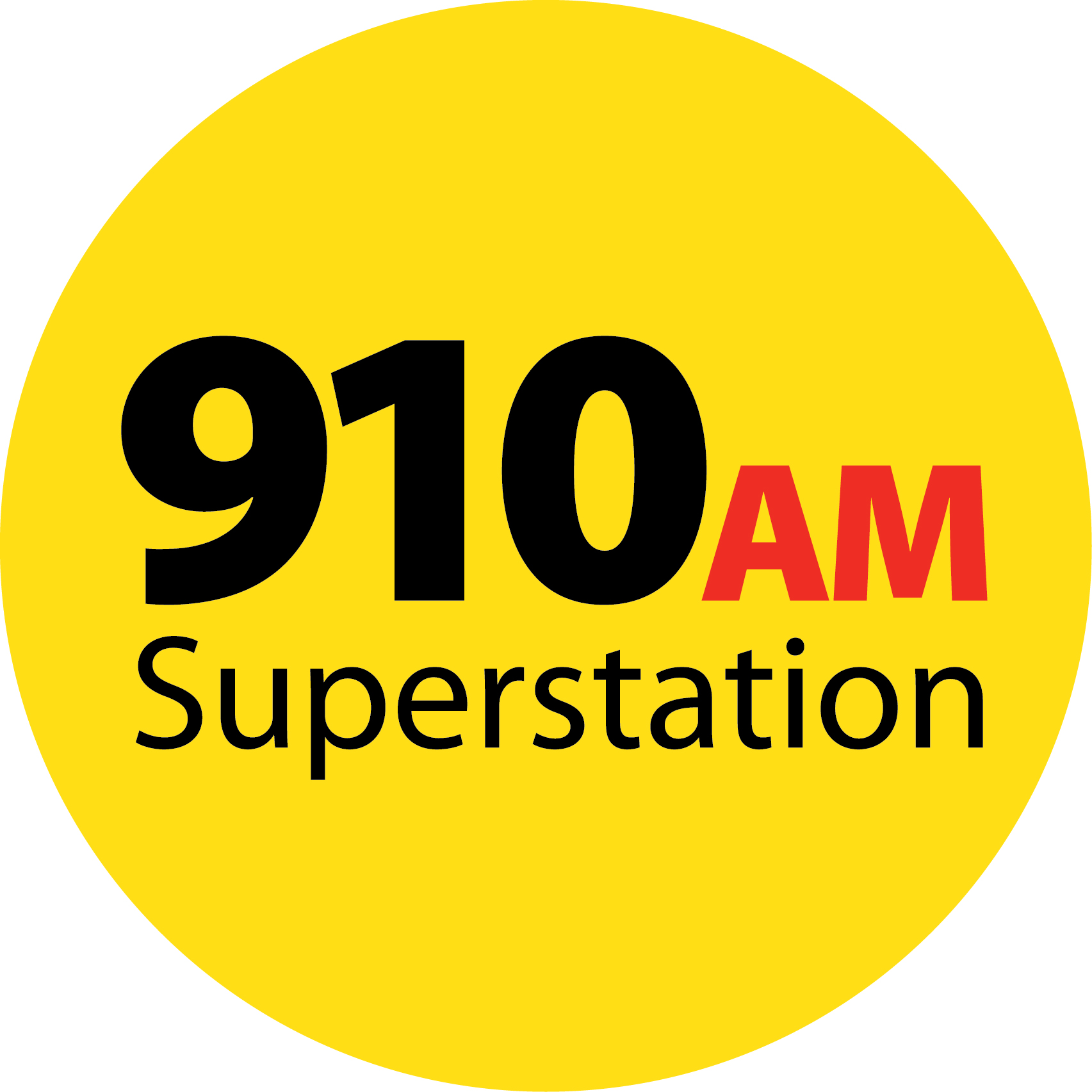
- Farmington Hills, Michigan; United States
- Broadcast area: Metro Detroit
- Frequency: 910 kHz (HD Radio)
- Branding: 910 AM Superstation

Programming
- Format: Conservative talk
- Network: ABC Radio News
- Affiliations: Premiere Networks; Red Apple Media

Ownership
- Owner: Kevin Adell; (Adell Radio Group, Inc.)
- Sister stations: WADL

History
- First air date: July 8, 1922 (Note: Originally licensed to Flint, Michigan; moved to Farmington Hills in 2006.)
- Former call signs: WEAA (1922–1925)
- Call sign meaning: Frank D. Fallain (original owner)

Technical information
- Licensing authority: FCC
- Facility ID: 13664
- Class: B
- Power: 50,000 watts (day); 25,000 watts (night)
- Transmitter coordinates: 42°03′57″N 83°23′39″W
- Repeater: 104.3 WOMC-HD2 (Detroit)

Links
- Public license information: Public file; LMS
- Webcast: Listen live
- Website: 910amsuperstation.com

WFDF (910 AM, "910 AM Superstation") is a commercial radio station licensed to Farmington Hills, Michigan, United States, and serving Metro Detroit with a conservative talk format. The station is owned by Kevin Adell via Adell Radio Group alongside WADL (channel 38) and The Word Network. Studios and offices are located at the Broadcast House on West Ten Mile Road in Southfield, Michigan, while the transmitter is sited on Maxwell Road in Carleton, Michigan.

WFDF transmits in HD and is also simulcast on the second digital subchannel of WOMC.

== History ==
=== WEAA and WFDF ===
The station is one of the oldest in Michigan, first licensed on May 25, 1922. Its original call sign was WEAA and it was located in Flint. It made its first broadcast on July 3, 1922. The call letters were changed to WFDF in 1925, in honor of the founder of the station, Frank D. Fallain (1890–1968).

For many years the station featured a full service, middle of the road format of popular adult music, news and sports, targeting Flint. It experimented with a Top 40 hits format (using the nickname "Giant 91") for a time in the early 1970s, but the station shifted its music mix back toward adult contemporary by 1975. In the 1980s, as listeners moved to FM to hear contemporary music, WFDF became an adult standards station aimed at older demographics.

The music ended and the station flipped to talk radio in 1993. In 2001, the station was acquired by Cumulus Broadcasting.

=== Move to Detroit market ===
In 2002, Cumulus sold the station to ABC Radio, a subsidiary of The Walt Disney Corporation. On August 15, at 3:49 pm, the station began featuring children's radio programming from Radio Disney. In 2003, Disney began preparations to move WFDF to the more lucrative Detroit radio market. It announced plans for a new eight-tower array in Monroe County, south of Detroit. Originally, Disney applied to use the new site only for daytime operation with Flint in the northwest corner of the proposed daytime coverage area. It would continue using the existing transmitter site in Burton, east of Flint, during nighttime hours. (Providing an interference-free nighttime signal to Flint from the Monroe County site, without exceeding the 50,000 watt maximum power limit, would have been practically impossible.) Shortly after WFDF started broadcasting with this two-site operation, Disney applied to change WFDF's city of license to Farmington Hills, a Detroit suburb, with 50,000 watts of daytime power and 25,000 watts at night, both from the Monroe County site.

For this change to take place, two radio stations operating at AM 900 that would have interfered with a relocated WFDF had to be deleted. Disney purchased the AM license of WFRO in Fremont, Ohio, while its FM sister station was spun off to a new owner. In Gaylord, Michigan, WSNQ went silent shortly after its FM station, WMJZ, was spun off to a new owner. With the two AM 900 stations now silenced, this paved the way for WFDF to substantially increase its power and move into the more profitable Detroit radio market.

The new array still covers Flint with a city-grade signal during daytime hours. The FCC granted a license for the new facilities in January 2006. The city of license changed in February 2006. The former towers in Burton were taken down and dismantled in April 2006.

The station's office is located in Southfield, moving away from Genesee County in the spring of 2006.

=== Change in ownership ===
On August 13, 2014, Disney put WFDF and 22 other Radio Disney stations up for sale, to focus on digital distribution of the network.

On November 18, the Radio Disney Group (the Disney subsidiary that held the license of the station) filed to sell WFDF to Adell Radio Group, Inc., an affiliate of The Word Network, owned by Kevin Adell. Adell also owns TV station WADL channel 38.

On January 20, 2015, The Word Network closed on the purchase of 910 AM at a price of $3 million. It changed the programming to its Christian talk and teaching format. The changeover took place with no prior announcement at 5 p.m. on January 20.

On November 9, 2015, Adell re-launched WFDF as "the Superstation", with an African American talk radio format. The station later carried ESPN Radio sports programming in the overnight hours.

On August 11, 2023, Adell suddenly announced that the station would rebrand to an "all-sports format" with a local morning show host to be named, though several media outlets speculated that Adell's financial issues (including the attempted sale of WADL to Mission Broadcasting) was a part of him selling off assets during a personal financial crisis. At this time, the station began to carry Fox Sports Radio full-time.

=== Flip to conservative talk ===
After a few weeks, plans changed. On September 1, 2023, Adell Media announced that WFDF would end its brief run at sports and would flip to a conservative talk format on September 5. It would feature a local morning show hosted by Justin Barclay (formerly of WOOD in Grand Rapids). The station would also carry most of the standard Premiere Networks syndicated talk schedule, including Glenn Beck, Clay Travis and Buck Sexton and Jesse Kelly, along with several other syndicated programs. The Sean Hannity Show would move from Salem Communications-owned talk station 1400 WDTK to WFDF.

The format change placed WFDF in direct competition with conservative talk rival WDTK. WFDF has an advantage over WDTK in terms of signal coverage area. WFDF has a 50,000-watt daytime signal and 25,000 watts at night. It reaches from Monroe through Genesee counties, covering nearly the entire Southeast Michigan radio market and into the city of Flint. Meanwhile, WDTK, with its 1,000 watt signal and its 99-watt FM translator, have coverage that is limited to the densely populated areas of Northern Wayne, and southern Oakland and Macomb Counties.

== Former personnel ==
WFDF formerly had a 30-person staff. In the fall of 2017, the station hired reporters Andre Ash, Detroit News editorial page editor Nolan Finley, and Steve Neavling, editor and publisher of the investigative news site MotorCityMuckraker.com.

On October 5, 2016, morning show host Ralph Godbee quit in the middle of his show because of a content dispute over programming conflicts the two had regarding the Word Network.

== See also ==
- Media in Detroit
