= WXYZ-TV =

Television station in Detroit

- Detroit, Michigan; United States
- Channels: Digital: 25 (UHF); Virtual: 7
- Branding: Channel 7, 7; 7 News Detroit

Programming
- Affiliations: 7.1: ABC; for others, see § Subchannels

Ownership
- Owner: E. W. Scripps Company; (Scripps Broadcasting Holdings LLC)
- Sister stations: WMYD

History
- First air date: October 9, 1948
- Former channel numbers: Analog: 7 (VHF, 1948–2009); Digital: 41 (UHF, 1998–2020)
- Call sign meaning: Taken from WXYZ radio, now WXYT

Technical information
- Licensing authority: FCC
- Facility ID: 10267
- ERP: 765 kW
- HAAT: 301 m (988 ft)
- Transmitter coordinates: 42°28′14″N 83°15′1″W

Links
- Public license information: Public file; LMS
- Website: www.wxyz.com

WXYZ-TV (channel 7) is a television station in Detroit, Michigan, United States, affiliated with ABC. It is owned by the E. W. Scripps Company alongside WMYD (channel 20), an independent station. The two stations share studios at Broadcast House on 10 Mile Road in Southfield, where WXYZ-TV's transmitter is also located.

== History ==
=== ABC-owned station ===
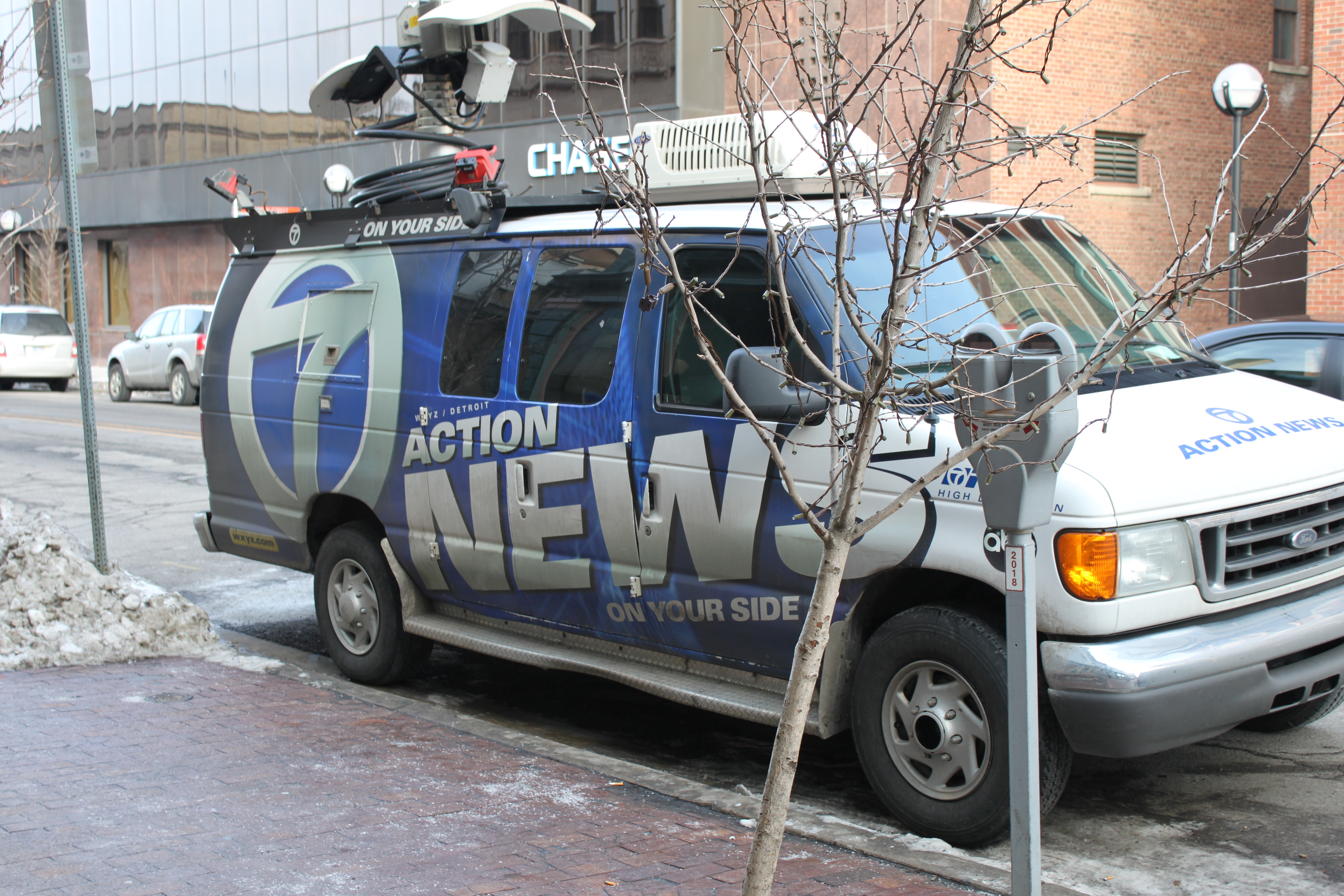
WXYZ-TV Action News remote van

The station first signed on the air on October 9, 1948, with 10 1/2 hours of programming as the second television station in both Detroit and Michigan, over a year behind WWJ-TV (channel 4, now WDIV-TV) and 15 days ahead of WJBK-TV (channel 2). Channel 7 was also the third of ABC's five original owned-and-operated television stations to sign on, after WJZ-TV in New York City and WENR-TV in Chicago, and before KGO-TV in San Francisco and KECA-TV in Los Angeles. WXYZ-TV was created out of ABC-owned radio station WXYZ (1270 AM), which produced the popular radio programs The Lone Ranger and The Green Hornet. WXYZ radio personality Dick Osgood was host of WXYZ-TV's inaugural broadcast.

The television station originally broadcast from studios located in the Maccabees Building on Woodward Avenue in midtown Detroit, across from the Detroit Institute of Arts. In the 1950s, WXYZ-TV began producing a series of popular and innovative programs that featured many personalities from WXYZ radio. The station's success generated revenues large enough that it became instrumental in financially helping the then-struggling ABC network and other ABC ventures during the 1950s, including ABC-Paramount Records. In 1959, all of WXYZ's radio and television operations moved into new broadcast facilities at Broadcast House, at 20777 West Ten Mile Road in Southfield, where WXYZ's television operations remain. The facility was built on the site of a former farm and included three television production studios and its own free-standing broadcast tower with a single-person maintenance elevator. WXYZ began broadcasting network programs in color in 1962 and started broadcasting local programs and newscasts in color around 1964.

By 1978, WXYZ-TV was the second most-dominant television station in the United States in terms of local viewership, no doubt attributable to ABC's prime-time ratings dominance and the continued success of Channel 7 Action News with lead news anchor Bill Bonds. In 1979, ABC named Jeanne Findlater as WXYZ-TV's general manager. She was the first woman to hold that title at a major market television station. WXYZ-TV was carried by the Cancom system from 1983 as the ABC station for Canadian cable television providers too distant to receive a border station's signal over-the-air, though later, Seattle station KOMO-TV was added to Cancom's offerings as a Pacific Time Zone alternative.

=== E. W. Scripps Company station ===
In May 1985, Capital Cities Communications, which owned Detroit radio stations WJR (760 AM) and WHYT (96.3 FM, originally WJR-FM, now WDVD), announced its acquisition of ABC. To comply with the Federal Communications Commission's (FCC) ownership limits of the time, the new Capital Cities/ABC would have to sell either WXYZ-TV or each of three radio stations that the two companies had owned – WJR, WHYT, or ABC-owned WRIF (101.1 FM; the former WXYZ-FM, which was sold as part of the merger). ABC had sold WXYZ (AM) a year earlier in 1984 to the radio station's general manager, Chuck Fritz, who changed its call sign to WXYT.

Upon gaining FCC approval of the merger in February 1986, the new company sold WXYZ-TV as well as Capital Cities' Tampa station WFTS-TV to the E. W. Scripps Company. Capital Cities/ABC intended to keep channel 7 together with WJR and WHYT through a waiver of the FCC's cross-ownership rules, as a contingency in case a similar request involving ABC's WABC-TV in New York City and Capital Cities' WPVI-TV in Philadelphia was denied. At the time, Cozzin Communications (a broadcast group owned by stand-up comedian/actor Bill Cosby) emerged as another prospective bidder for the station. ABC retained some of WXYZ-TV's assets, including the satellite uplink for its satellite news-gathering service ABC NewsOne. Under Scripps ownership, WXYZ-TV retained the ABC network affiliation and continued to use ABC's (originally) proprietary Circle 7 logo.

Scripps used the station's popularity as leverage for Detroit's cable providers to carry the Scripps-owned HGTV cable network, using the FCC's retransmission consent rule to force local cable systems to carry HGTV. Under this rule, a television station that is carried on a cable system under must-carry rules can request cable systems to compensate the station for carrying it. The station was selected as the site of the first Town Meeting with President Bill Clinton in February 1993, which was hosted by Bill Bonds. President Clinton would address questions from audience members at WXYZ-TV's studios as well as audiences at other television stations via satellite.

==== 1994 affiliation switch repercussions ====
On May 23, 1994, New World Communications, the owner of then-CBS affiliate WJBK (channel 2), signed an affiliation deal with Fox Broadcasting Company. This deal, which displaced Fox from WKBD-TV (channel 50), prompted CBS to attempt to lure WXYZ-TV, as well as sister station WEWS-TV in Cleveland to drop its ABC affiliation in favor of switching to CBS; WDIV was not an option for the network, as that station had a long-term affiliation contract with NBC at the time.

On June 16, 1994, Scripps signed a long-term deal with ABC that would keep WXYZ-TV and WEWS-TV as affiliates of the network (they remain ABC affiliates to this day). As a condition of that agreement, television stations in other cities, including WTSP in Tampa–St. Petersburg, KTVK in Phoenix and WJZ-TV in Baltimore, would lose their ABC affiliations to competing Scripps-owned stations (WFTS-TV, KNXV-TV and WMAR-TV, respectively) in those cities. CBS ultimately affiliated with (and then purchased) UHF independent station WGPR-TV (channel 62, now WWJ-TV).

==== Present day ====
WXYZ-TV has been active in several community service projects. The station received the National Community Service Award from the National Academy of Television Arts and Sciences for outstanding community service in 1989. WXYZ-TV is a partner in several charitable endeavors including the Society of Saint Vincent de Paul, Operation Can Do and Detroit's annual children's immunization fair.

On July 12, 2012, the E. W. Scripps Company signed an affiliation agreement with Bounce TV to make WXYZ-TV the Detroit area affiliate of the network, becoming the first Scripps-owned station to affiliate with Bounce TV, a network it would eventually acquire outright.

== Programming ==
=== Programming history ===
In the 1950s, WXYZ-TV created a series of widely popular locally produced children's programs. The most famous program, Lunch with Soupy, launched the career of comedian Soupy Sales. The program debuted in 1953 and was such a success that ABC moved production to Los Angeles in 1960 and aired the show nationally. Sales also hosted a very popular late night adult comedy show during that same period in the 1950s called Soupy's On. Other successful children's shows to follow would include Wyxie's Wonderland hosted by Detroit comic Marv Welch. In 1954, Bob Brickwedde (using the stage name Bob Henry) hosted the Nash Theater Hour on Thursday nights and hosted Western movies featuring Deadeye and Black Bart on Saturdays as "Sheriff Bob". Ricky the Clown was hosted by professional clown and magician Irv Romig and The Johnny Ginger Show was hosted by local comic Johnny Ginger. The Auntie Dee Show hosted by Dee Parker was a popular children's talent show. In 1974, WXYZ-TV launched and produced another successful children's show, the nationally syndicated Hot Fudge.

Former WXYZ-TV general manager John Pival is credited for launching several other popular innovative programs in the 1950s and 1960s including the World Adventure Series with host George Pierrot, an author on world travel and a speaker at the Detroit Institute of Arts. The program showed films about exotic locations around the world. The Lady of Charm and later House O' Charm with host Edythe Fern Melrose was a predecessor to today's Martha Stewart home-making programs. Prize Movie with popular host Rita Bell introduced feature films and held a viewer call-in contest (with cash prizes that started at $7) to name the title of a song she played on the air. Several music programs also aired including Club Polka and Club 1270. WXYZ-TV disc jockey Ed McKenzie also brought his talents to television with The Ed McKenzie Saturday Party, which featured live musical performances from such artists as Chuck Berry and Louis Armstrong.

WXYZ-TV also had a series of popular morning shows starting with the Pat and Johnny Show, hosted by WXYZ radio announcers Pat Tobin and Johnny Slagle. Later in 1966, The Morning Show debuted as a morning variety program with host Bob Hynes. The station also helped to launch the career of Dennis Wholey, who started his AM Detroit talk show at WXYZ before going on to WTVS (channel 56) to host PBS Late Night. The most popular and successful WXYZ morning talk show was Kelly & Company, which ran from 1978 to 1995 and was hosted by a married couple who were both former members of WXYZ-TV's news staff, John Kelly (who served as news anchor) and Marilyn Turner (who served as a weathercaster). It was primarily a talk show with featured guests and a studio audience. In 1984, Turner and Kelly would also host the short-lived afternoon program, Good Afternoon Detroit. The program was a pilot for other ABC-owned stations including those in New York and Chicago to launch their own Good Afternoon... shows.

In 1965, the Sunday morning public affairs show Spotlight on the News debuted, with WXYZ-TV's news director Bill Fyffe as its first host. The show was later hosted by political reporter Jim Herrington and continues to air today with WXYZ-TV editorial and public affairs director Chuck Stokes as its host, writer and producer. Spotlight is now Detroit's longest-running current events television program. It has featured local and national public officials including U.S. presidents and won numerous awards. Another public affairs show that aired Sunday nights at 11:30 p.m. from 1967 to 1981 was Haney's People with host Don Haney.

WXYZ-TV has also been involved in several Detroit traditions over the years, having aired special coverage of Detroit's Thanksgiving Day Parade, The North American International Auto Show Charity Preview, the annual Woodward Dream Cruise and the City of Detroit's celebrations of its 250th anniversary in 1951 and 300th anniversary in 2001. WXYZ's special coverage has also included the victory parades of the city's professional sports teams, most recently the Detroit Red Wings' Stanley Cup victory in 2008 and the Detroit Pistons' NBA championship in 2004. WXYZ-TV also aired the Red Wings' 2002 Stanley Cup Finals series win, and the station provided local coverage of Super Bowl XL that was held at Ford Field. The station is also the official broadcaster of the Christmas parade in Rochester, Michigan. In 1987, the station created and produced a weekly educational literacy program aimed at children called Learn To Read, which was based on the audio-lingual method of literacy education, and was co-produced by Kentucky Educational Television. One of the hosts of this series was then WXYZ-TV news anchor Doris Biscoe.

During Game 2 of the 2004 NBA Finals in Detroit, Jimmy Kimmel appeared on ABC's halftime show to make an on-air plug for that night's episode of Jimmy Kimmel Live!. He suggested that if the Detroit Pistons defeated the Los Angeles Lakers, "they're gonna burn the city of Detroit down ... and it's not worth it". Channel 7 officials immediately announced that night's show would not air on the station. Hours later, ABC officials pulled that night's show from the entire network. Kimmel later apologized. Later that year, the station opted to preempt Saving Private Ryan, along with the other Scripps stations.

In 2011, WXYZ-TV replaced WWJ-TV as the new flagship of the Detroit Lions Television Network, assuming broadcast rights to the team's over-the-air preseason game telecasts. The agreement ended in 2015, with the telecasts being moved to WJBK.

=== News operation ===
WXYZ-TV presently broadcasts 42 1/2 hours of locally produced newscasts each week (with seven hours each weekday, four hours on Saturdays and 3 1/2 hours on Sundays); in addition, the station produces two half-hour sports programs that air on Sundays, the weekly sports highlight program 7 Sports Cave (which airs weekly at 11 am) and the Detroit Lions highlight program Ford Lions Report Live (which only airs during the NFL season).

==== History ====
WXYZ-TV's newscasts had long been dominant in the Detroit market's news ratings partly due to the popularity of longtime lead news anchor Bill Bonds. The station's news department started as a small operation, with short twice-a-weeknight updates anchored by previous staff announcer Lee McNew and longtime sportscaster Dave Diles. WXYZ would later gain credibility for its coverage of the 1967 Detroit race riots. In the 1970s, WXYZ-TV began an aggressive build-up of its news department by adopting many elements of the Eyewitness News format, such as the Cool Hand Luke music theme that was used by ABC's four other owned-and-operated television stations in New York City, Chicago, Los Angeles and San Francisco. However, it opted to title its newscasts Action News, since rival WJBK-TV was already using the Eyewitness News brand. Under the direction of general manager Jim Osborn and news director Phil Nye, the station would lure popular news personalities from rival stations, WJBK-TV and WDIV-TV (then known as WWJ-TV) to join its already well-known anchors Dave Diles and Bill Bonds. WXYZ-TV assembled Detroit's most popular news anchors and reporters for its news staff such as John Kelly, Jac LeGoff, Al Ackerman, Marilyn Turner, Jack McCarthy, Jerry Hodak, Don Lark and Doris Biscoe.

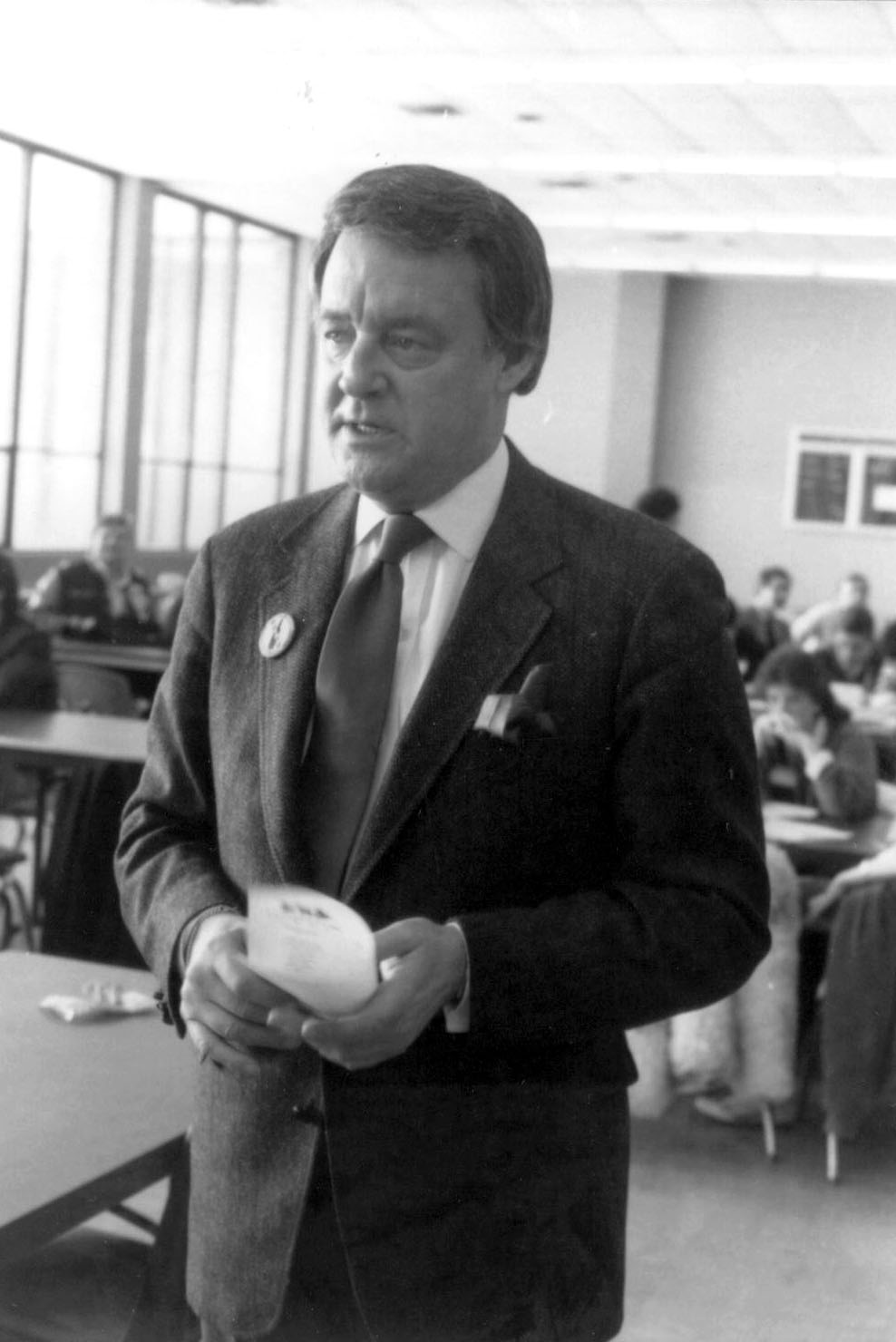
Former Action News Anchor Bill Bonds prepares to interview students at Harrison High School in Farmington Hills, Michigan (1985 photo).

By 1973, WXYZ-TV's newscasts became the highest-rated in Detroit for the first time ever, a lead it would maintain for almost four decades. Its success was linked to the serious, controversial, opinionated hard delivery of lead anchor Bill Bonds. ABC tried to apply Bonds' success in Detroit at KABC-TV in Los Angeles in the late 1960s and again in 1975 at New York City's WABC-TV; in both cases, he was unsuccessful and soon returned to WXYZ-TV. During the 1980s and 1990s, Bonds hosted the interview segment, Up Front, on WXYZ-TV's 5 p.m. newscast. During the interviews, Bonds confronted the Detroit area's public officials and newsmakers with hard-hitting and sometimes controversial questions. Bonds' hard-edge style was widely known in Detroit for both captivating viewers while repulsing others, leading Bonds to become the station's icon and its main star. In Ron Powers' book, The Newscasters, Powers called Bonds "one of the six most influential news anchors in the country". However, Bonds had public battles with alcoholism which are credited with his dismissal from the station in 1995. Bonds anchored newscasts and a late night talk-show called Bonds Tonight at WJBK-TV shortly afterwards and later hosted a radio show at WXYT. Bonds returned to WXYZ-TV in 1999 to present editorials during the newscasts but left the station after only a few months.

WXYZ-TV's ratings dominance was challenged by WDIV-TV starting in the 1980s, due in part to a change of ownership and culture at WDIV and viewers looking for an alternative to Bonds' hard-hitting style of news presentation. The two stations continue to battle for ratings to this day. In recent years, the station's news coverage received several journalism honors including two Alfred I. duPont-Columbia University awards, and the George Foster Peabody Award. WXYZ-TV's Action News was named the best television newscast in the U.S. by United Press International in 1989.

In the 1990s, WXYZ-TV continued to expand its morning newscast, Action News This Morning to the eventual start time of 5 am. This newscast had originated in the form of short news updates that aired during Good Morning America. The ratings battle between WXYZ-TV and WDIV-TV continued in this decade. One of its longtime co-anchors was Erik Smith, who worked at Channel 7 off-and-on for over 40 years. During most of that time, Smith also reported on human-interest and entertainment stories. Smith also won acclaim for his award-winning series From the Heart which began in the late 1990s as a collection of heartwarming, historical and inspirational stories from around the Detroit area. Smith left the station in May 2010, due to a dispute with management, five days before his contract was set to expire.

In 2001, WXYZ-TV debuted a 7 p.m. newscast, a move that occurred after the September 11 attacks when the station chose to move ABC's World News Tonight ahead by 30 minutes to 6:30 pm. The 7 p.m. newscast became a forum for interviewing guests and newsmakers on daily issues and became a ratings success in key demographics. The station also expanded its noon newscast to one hour. In 2002, WXYZ-TV entered into a news share agreement with Viacom, then-owner of WWJ-TV and UPN affiliate WKBD-TV to produce WKBD's 10 p.m. newscast; this resulted in WKBD shutting down its news department, while also effectively cancelling the newscast it produced for WWJ-TV. A handful of Viacom's Detroit employees were transferred to WXYZ-TV. Viacom would also transfer the operations of its CBS News satellite news-gathering service CBS Newspath to offices at WXYZ-TV's Broadcast House studios, since WXYZ-TV would also be allowed to use the resources of CBS News. The newscast was canceled in late 2004 due to poor viewership (WKBD and WWJ-TV later resumed local newscasts with the former using the CBSN Local streaming service for Detroit News Now from January 2020 to August 2023 and the latter launching CBS News Detroit in January 2023). On October 4, 2006, WXYZ became the first television station in Michigan and the first Scripps-owned station to begin broadcasting its local newscasts in high definition.

Action News continued its success with longtime anchors Diana Lewis, Robbie Timmons, meteorologist Jerry Hodak, sportscaster Don Shane and up until October 9, 2006, anchor Frank Turner, who became a successful replacement to Bill Bonds. Another addition to the news staff was anchor Stephen Clark, a former anchor at WCBS-TV in New York and CBS News correspondent. Chief meteorologist Jerry Hodak was the station's primary weathercaster for at least 26 of his more than 40 years in Detroit television. In July 2010, Hodak announced his retirement from WXYZ-TV with his last broadcast occurring two months later on September 23. In 2006, WXYZ-TV also boasted the most veteran general assignment reporters in Detroit television with Cheryl Chodun, Bill Proctor, Mary Conway and Val Clark, each of whom worked at least 20 years at the station.

In the November 2006 ratings period, shortly after the switch to HD, all of WXYZ-TV's newscasts placed first in their respective timeslots except at 11 pm, which lagged behind WDIV-TV. From the November 2007 ratings period until before the May 2009 ratings period, WXYZ-TV's newscasts were No. 1 in each of its respective timeslots. However, it finished behind rival WDIV-TV, which took first place in the evening and late news timeslots in the May 2009 sweeps period due largely to lower ratings of shows leading into WXYZ-TV's news programs. Both WXYZ-TV and WDIV-TV have been among the country's strongest affiliates of their respective networks over the years although WDIV-TV has taken over first place in all newscast time slots since late 2009. In very recent years, however, WXYZ-TV and WJBK have been battling for second place in the 5 to 6:30 p.m. block behind WDIV-TV.

WXYZ-TV's investigative unit, the "7 Investigators", gained notoriety in 2002 with chief investigative reporter Steve Wilson and his stories of financial mismanagement at the Kmart Corporation, an undercover investigation that exposed high-pressure sales tactics used by a well-known financial firm, and confrontations with elected officials in Detroit, especially Mayor Kwame Kilpatrick. On August 7, 2008, Kilpatrick appeared in front of a judge in Wayne County Circuit Court. The hearing was called to discuss a potential violation of his bond in one of the two felony cases against him. The hearing was called after Wilson uncovered and revealed photos of the mayor in nearby Windsor, Ontario, Canada. A stipulation of the mayor's bond was that he was not to leave the country, and that he give the court 72 hours' notice if he planned to leave the state of Michigan for any reason. Mayor Kilpatrick was then ordered to spend the night in the Wayne County jail.

The current team of "7 Investigators" is made up of Heather Catallo and Ross Jones.

On August 3, 2011, WXYZ-TV unveiled a new news set during its noon newscast, a project which the station had been working on since June 2011. The new set features new high definition cameras and monitors and a redesigned weather center under the new forecast branding "7 First Alert Weather". On October 3, 2012, Diana Lewis left WXYZ-TV after working at the station for a total of 32 years (having joined the station in 1977, before leaving in 1985 and returning to Channel 7 three years later).

On January 26, 2014, WXYZ-TV discontinued the Sunday Sports Update in favor of expanding its Sunday 11 p.m. newscast to one hour. In turn, one week later on February 2, the station launched a new Sunday morning sports program, the 7 Sports Cave.

On June 16, 2014, WXYZ-TV introduced a new 10 p.m. newscast for its new sister station, WMYD, under the name of 7 Action News at 10 on TV 20 Detroit. The newscast replaced an outsourced newscast with local reporters anchored by staff at former WMYD sister station WPTA in Fort Wayne, Indiana. Months later, the station introduced two more hours of morning news on WMYD as well.

On September 8, 2014, WXYZ-TV introduced a new 4 p.m. newscast called "The Now Detroit".

On February 23, 2015, WXYZ-TV expanded into Downtown Detroit with a new street-side studio inside the Chase Tower; this new studio serves as the location for 7 Action News at Noon anchored by Joanne Purtan, and other WXYZ/WMYD programs.

On April 22, 2024, after five decades of the Action News branding, WXYZ-TV rebranded its newscasts as 7 News Detroit.

==== Notable current on-air staff ====
- Brad Galli – sports reporter/anchor
- Faraz Javed – multimedia journalist and weekend morning reporter

==== Notable former on-air staff ====
- Dennis Archer – public affairs show host (1973–1979)
- Bill Bonds – longtime lead anchor of Action News (1961–1968, 1971–1975 and 1976–1995)
- Dave Diles – sports director
- Bill Flemming – sports director
- Johnny Ginger – host of The Johnny Ginger Show
- Steve Handelsman – investigative reporter, fill-in anchor (1978–1984)
- Chris Hansen
- Jerry Hodak – chief meteorologist
- Bill Ratner – one of his former voice-over clients (2000s–2011?)
- Soupy Sales – host of Lunch with Soupy and Soupy's On
- Tom Shannon – morning host (1960s)
- Robbie Timmons (1982–2010) – longtime co-anchor of Action News at 5
- Steve Wilson – chief investigative reporter

== Technical information ==
=== Subchannels ===
WXYZ-TV's transmitter is located at the studios on 10 Mile Road in Southfield. The station's signal is multiplexed:

Subchannels of WXYZ-TV
Subchannel	Res.	Short name	Programming
7.1	720p	WXYZ-HD	ABC
7.2	480i	WXYZ-BN	Bounce TV
7.3	480i	WXYZ-LF	Laff
7.4	480i	WXYZ-CT	Court TV
7.5	480i	ShopLC	Shop LC
20.1	720p	WMYD-HD	WMYD (Independent)
20.4	480i	HSN	HSN (WMYD)

Broadcast on behalf of another station

=== Analog-to-digital conversion ===
WXYZ-TV became the first television station in Detroit to transmit an over-the-air digital signal, broadcasting on UHF channel 41 on September 29, 1998. The station shut down its analog signal, over VHF channel 7, on June 12, 2009, the official date on which full-power television stations in the United States transitioned from analog to digital broadcasts under federal mandate. The station's digital signal continued to broadcast on its pre-transition UHF channel 41, using virtual channel 7. WJBK began using the channel 7 allocation for its digital signal after the transition.

WXYZ-TV's third digital subchannel originally carried a video feed of the station's tower camera at Broadcast House. Most recently, it formerly carried Doppler7Weather, a local weather channel looping weather radar, temperatures and live local radar, along with an L-Bar (similar to that used by The Local AccuWeather Channel and the defunct NBC Weather Plus, though it was operated independently from either network) that showed current conditions and five-day local forecasts. On May 21, 2010, this channel was removed to prepare and use its channel bandwidth exclusively for mobile television, labeled as WXYZ-MH 7.3 and simulcasting 7.2/Live Well Network at 1.83 Mbit/s. WXYZ-TV, along with WDIV-TV, became the first Detroit stations to offer Mobile DTV feeds on August 6, 2010.

== Coverage ==
In addition to carriage across Southeast Michigan, WXYZ-TV is carried on most cable providers in Southwestern Ontario and Northwestern Ohio. Coverage on cable systems outside the Detroit/Windsor market may be subject to syndication exclusivity rules and network blackouts in the United States and simsubbing in Canada. The station can be received from as far away as Flint, Michigan, with a good-quality antenna. It is also carried on cable in Grand Marais, Michigan.

The station also serves several other parts of Canada as an ABC affiliate on satellite provider Shaw Direct as well as on cable providers in several Canadian markets including Windsor, London, Sault Ste. Marie, Sudbury and Thunder Bay, Ontario, Saint John, New Brunswick, and all of Manitoba (except for areas served by Shaw's Steinbach or Winnipeg system, which carry WDAZ-TV out of Grand Forks, North Dakota, instead) and the National Capital Region.

WXYZ-TV was previously offered as the ABC affiliate on cable through Cable Atlantic (now Rogers Cable) in Newfoundland and Labrador including in St. John's from 1985 to 1997 (which has since been replaced by Boston ABC affiliate WCVB-TV). As of 2010, however, some Rogers Cable customers in Newfoundland and Labrador began receiving WXYZ-TV again along with WDIV and WWJ.

Until April 2011, Comcast subscribers in Holly, which is located within the Detroit market in northwestern Oakland County, were unable to see much of WXYZ-TV's programming, as it was often blacked out at the request of Flint's WJRT-TV; the blackout was due to the Comcast system being tied to the Flint headend, instead of one in Oakland County or elsewhere in Detroit. That month, following complaints from Detroit stations and area viewers of being blacked out or unavailable in an area that they were supposed to serve, Comcast discontinued blackouts of the Detroit stations it already carried, added additional stations from that market and dropped many Flint–Tri-Cities area stations from that system. WJRT-TV was one of two stations retained (along with WCMZ-TV) as it was considered to have significant viewership in the Holly area.

== See also ==
- Circle 7 logo
- Media in Detroit
