= Bill Bonds =

American television news anchor (1932-2014)

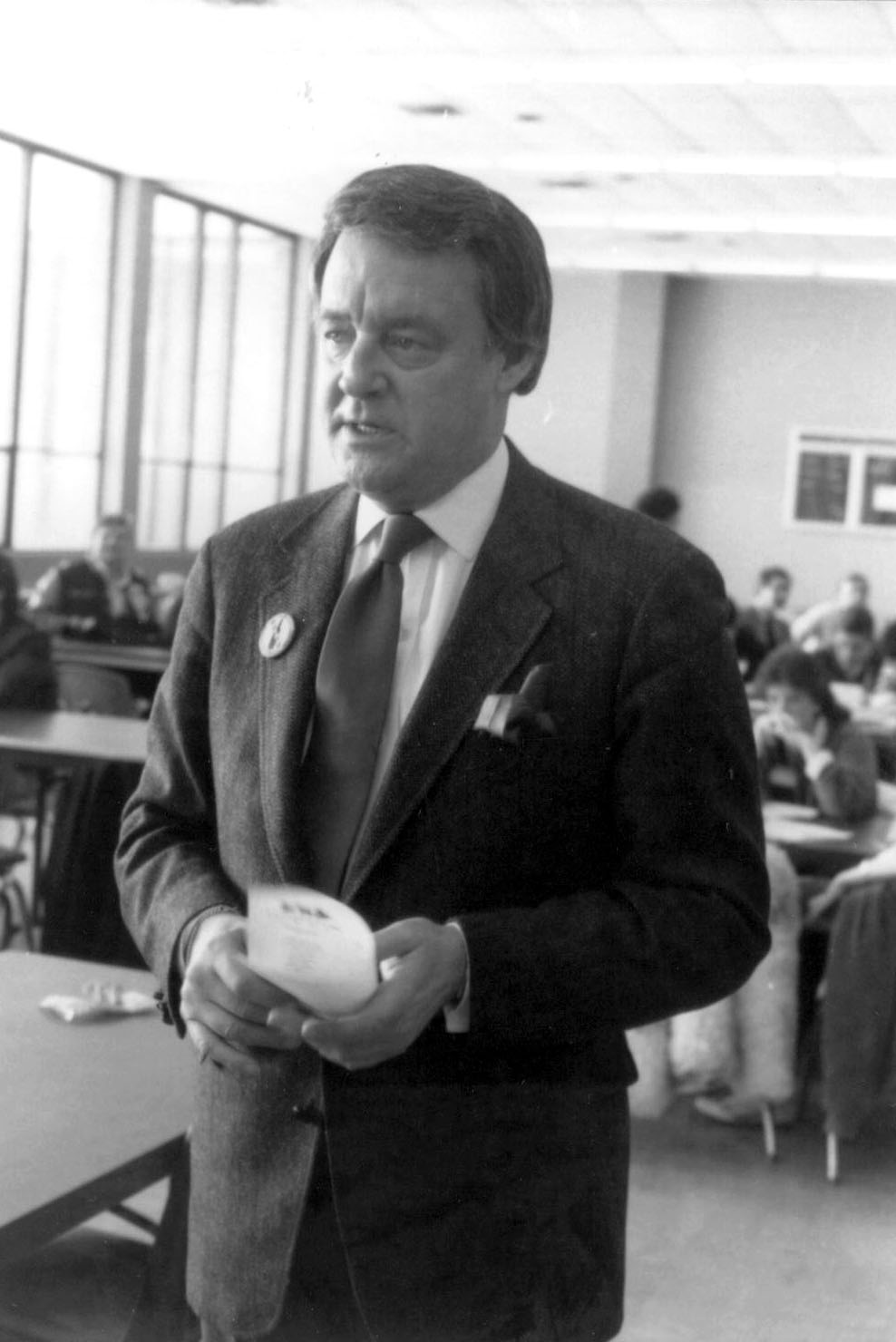
- Bonds in 1985
- Born: William Duane Bonds; February 23, 1932; Detroit, Michigan, U.S.
- Died: December 13, 2014 (aged 82); Bloomfield Hills, Michigan, U.S.
- Education: University of Detroit (BA)
- Occupations: Television news anchor; journalist
- Spouse: Joanne Bonds (m. 1962; div. 1986)
- Children: 4

William Duane Bonds (February 23, 1932 – December 13, 2014) was an American television news anchor and reporter, best known for his work at WXYZ-TV in Detroit, Michigan. Bonds became an Action News anchorman beginning in the early 1970s.

== Early life and education ==
Bonds was born in Detroit. He served in the United States Air Force from 1951 to 1955 before graduating from the University of Detroit with a Bachelor of Arts degree in political science and English in 1959.

== Career ==
Bonds began his career in 1959, working in radio in Albion, Michigan. He later served as a reporter for WKNR-AM, WCAR, WPON and WQTE. Bonds joined WXYZ in 1964 as a part-time booth announcer. He worked his way up to the anchor desk with Barney Morris. He covered the 1967 Detroit riots.

=== Newscaster ===
Bonds was transferred by ABC to become anchorman at KABC-TV in Los Angeles in 1968 to help launch its version of Eyewitness News. He returned to WXYZ-TV in 1971 just as the station was beginning a major upgrade of its news department under the Action News banner. Two years later, it became the highest-rated news broadcast in Detroit, a position it held up until 2011.

WXYZ-TV borrowed most of the basic elements of the Eyewitness News format from its fellow ABC owned and operated stations (WXYZ was an ABC O&O from sign-on in 1948 until ABC sold it in 1985 as part of its merger with Capital Cities Communications). However, it adopted a somewhat harder approach under Bonds' influence. Apart from his stint in Los Angeles, Bonds anchored at WABC-TV in New York from 1975 to 1976 after which he returned to Detroit. When WXYZ expanded to a 5pm newscast in 1982 Bonds would anchor that newscast and continue as anchor of its 11 p.m. newscast until 1995, when he was fired following a drunk driving arrest. He also occasionally filled in as anchor of ABC's weekend newscasts.

=== Interviews and talk shows ===
During the 1980s and 1990s, Bonds hosted an interview segment on the 5 p.m. news called "Up Front" in which he confronted newsmakers with tough questions. One of his frequent targets was longtime Detroit Mayor Coleman Young; their sparring matches were the stuff of local legend (including a fistfight challenge given by Bonds to Young in July 1989). The segment was unique in that it would often feature national newsmakers interviewed by Bonds via satellite. (A famous incident came in 1991 when Utah Senator Orrin Hatch stormed off set during an especially heated line of questioning by Bonds.)

In 1991, Bonds participated in the nationally televised town hall meeting for Democratic presidential candidates Bill Clinton, Jerry Brown and Paul Tsongas.

Bonds joined rival WJBK-TV as host of an 11 p.m. talk show Bonds Tonight on WJBK-TV and also anchored newscasts. He returned to WXYZ for several months in 1999 to read editorials, but left to lend his voice to radio and TV commercials, including the Detroit furniture company Gardner-White.

== Later life and death ==
Bonds married his wife Joanne in 1962. They had four children before divorcing in 1986.

He died at his home in Bloomfield Hills, Michigan, on December 13, 2014, at age 82, from a heart attack.

== Filmography ==
| Year | Title | Role | Notes |
|---|---|---|---|
| 1970 | It Takes a Thief | Newscaster | TV series, 1 episode |
| 1971 | Escape from the Planet of the Apes | TV Newscaster | |
