= Creature Double Feature =

US syndicated horror television series

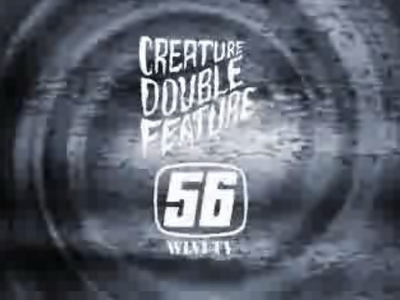
- Created by: Kaiser Broadcasting (1972–1977); Field Communications (1977–1983); Tribune Broadcasting (2006)
- Starring: various Autumn (2006–)
- Country of origin: United States

Production
- Running time: 3 hours (1972–1983); 4 hours (2006–)

Original release
- Network: Kaiser Broadcasting stations WLVI and WKBS-TV_(Philadelphia)
- Release: 1972 – 1983

Creature Double Feature is a television show, syndicated in the Boston and Philadelphia area during the 1960s, 1970s and 1980s. It sometimes also aired under names like Sci-Fi Flix and Creature Feature. The show aired classic monster movies, with the name "Creature Double Feature" based on its airing two movies during its three-hour time slot. The movies broadcast were taken from the classic Universal Horror movies of the 1930s to 1950s, the Hammer Studios and American International Pictures films of the 1950s, Roger Corman's horror films of the 1960s, and Toho Studio's "giant monster" (known in Japanese as either kaiju or tokusatsu) movies of the 1950s, 1960s, and 1970s.

== Air times ==
Creature Double Feature usually aired on Saturday afternoons. Because it aired after the traditional Saturday morning cartoon time block, it introduced many younger viewers to classic (and not-so-classic) monster movies. In other cities it aired either on Friday night or Saturday night.

=== Boston ===
Beginning in 1972 a station in the Kaiser Broadcasting (later Field Communications) chain, WKBG (Channel 56; WLVI after The Boston Globe sold their share back to Kaiser in 1975) aired its collection of Godzilla movies—one per week at 4 p.m. on Saturday under the title, The 4 O'Clock Movie. They cycled through their collection twice, noticing that the broadcasts were especially popular with youngsters. Then, they started showing the films at midnight, calling it Creature Feature. The ratings became so popular that the show was moved to noon to increase its ratings. However, it was in direct competition with WCVB-TV's Candlepin Bowling and was moved to the 2 p.m. time slot. Its popularity grew and they tweaked the title to Creature Double Feature and changed its start time to 1 p.m. The show quickly became a staple of the station's Saturday programming schedule during the 1970s and early-1980s. Although the exact date of the final show is currently unknown, it seems to have petered out sometime in 1983 and was replaced with WLVI-TV's Martial Arts Theater, showing cheap English-dubbed Hong Kong martial arts movies, as a replacement.

To this day WLVI staffers report that they still receive more e-mail and phone calls about Creature Double Feature than anything else. In 2006, Channel 56's Steve Ratner was quoted in The Boston Globe as saying "I'm amazed at the following the show continues to have. It's just insane how many people come up to us and ask after the Creature Double Feature. Every day we get e-mails from people all over the country." However, the station is unlikely to revive the show on their own since that timeslot is usually used now for infomercials, from which the station makes a considerable amount of income. The main announcer on Creature Double Feature was a Channel 56 long-time booth announcer, Neil MacNevin. His radio/TV name was Tom Evans. He and an engineer named Press Campbell would create sound effects, echoes, wind etc. off the cuff during the weekly recording sessions for the movie and promos for CDF during the week. MacNevin says he still gets comments from some of the listeners from those days and really enjoys telling them about the sessions. MacNevin and Campbell retired from broadcasting in the early nineties.

In June 2006, the Boston Herald reported that Boston-area car dealership owner Ernie Boch Jr. would be bringing the show back to WLVI—in its original timeslot—on an occasional basis. The first program of the new series aired on June 24, 2006. The two films shown on this occasion were Godzilla vs. the Smog Monster and The Giant Gila Monster. Boch himself hosted the show in full makeup as The Ghoul, though the original show almost never had a host—only announcers (other than for a brief time when Rich Koz, the Son of Svengoolie out of Chicago, hosted the CDF in the early '80s). A second episode aired on October 28, 2006, featuring 1973's Horror Express followed by the original 1968 Night of the Living Dead. It was brought back again on October 27, 2007 with the American International Pictures' (A.I.P.) movies Gammera the Invincible (a.k.a. Gamera) and Attack of the Monsters. The broadcast contained no pop-up ads during the films and no interruptions from any on-air talent personnel during commercial breaks. The Boston Globe's Sunday Edition of their TV guide printed the schedule of the two Gamera movie titles reversed in their time slots.

The show's original announcers were reportedly Ron Dwyer and Tom Evans. During most of its run in its later years, the show's announcer was Dale Dorman aka "Uncle Dale", a Boston radio personality at WRKO and at WXKS-FM who also frequently did voice work for 56's children's programming.

The intro/outro music used for Creature Double Feature throughout its run was Emerson, Lake & Palmer's "Toccata" from Brain Salad Surgery. WLVI has kept the song as the theme of the 2006 and 2007 revival. It is not yet known if current WLVI owners Sunbeam Television will continue to air the revival.

=== Philadelphia ===
In the Philadelphia area, another Kaiser/Field station, WKBS Channel 48, aired this program between 1976 and 1979 after the success the show had in Boston. Two of the most popular films included Attack of the Mushroom People and Tourist Trap.
