= WKBF-TV =

Television station in Cleveland (1968–1975)

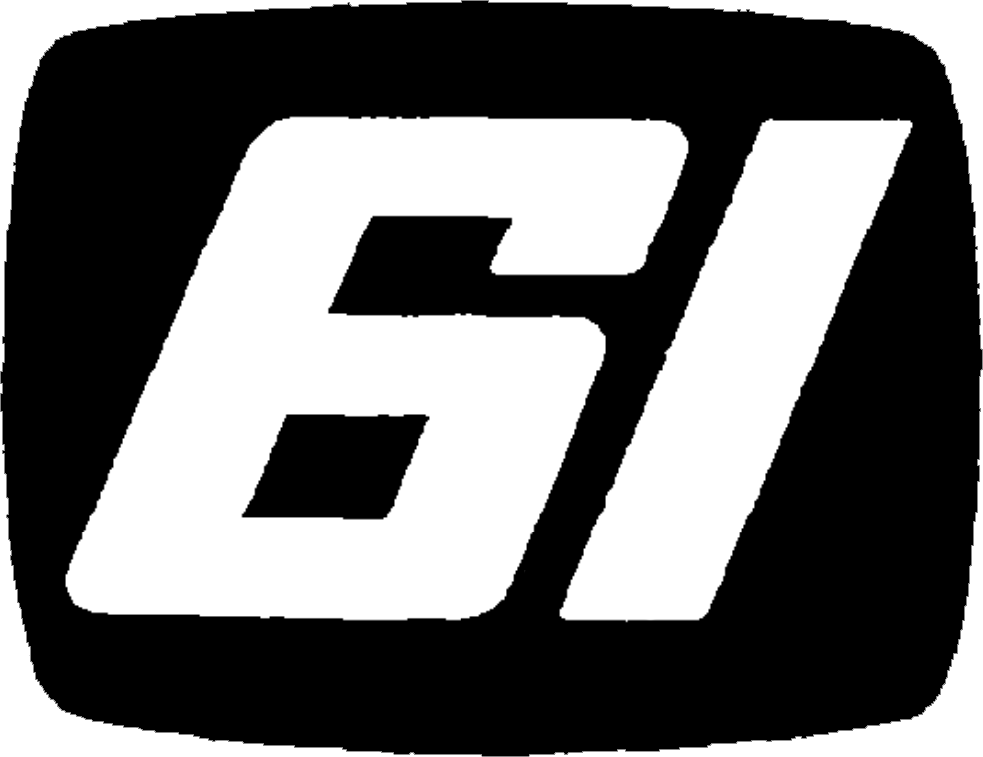
- Cleveland, Ohio; United States
- Channels: Analog: 61 (UHF)

Programming
- Affiliations: Independent

Ownership
- Owner: Kaiser Broadcasting; (1968–1975); Superior Broadcasting; (co-owner, 1968–1972); Field Communications; (co-owner, 1973–1975)

History
- First air date: January 19, 1968
- Last air date: April 25, 1975
- Call sign meaning: Kaiser Broadcasting and Frank Mavec

Technical information
- Power: 3,020 kW
- HAAT: 1,070 feet (330 m)
- Transmitter coordinates: 41°22′45.3″N 81°43′11.7″W

WKBF-TV (channel 61) was a television station in Cleveland, Ohio, United States, which broadcast from January 1968 to April 1975. Owned by Kaiser Broadcasting as one of an eventual group of six stations, it was the first ultra high frequency (UHF) independent station to serve northeast Ohio and the last outlet constructed by the Kaiser chain during the 1960s to begin operations. Despite airing several high-profile local programs, Kaiser's efforts to establish itself in Cleveland never took root because of the establishment of a second independent outlet, WUAB, later that same year, as well as general stagnation in the Cleveland market. In April 1975, Kaiser shut WKBF-TV down and sold its programming inventory to WUAB in exchange for a minority stake in that station.

WKBF-TV maintained studios in the Cleveland suburb of Euclid, Ohio, while the transmitter was located in nearby Parma.

== Application and construction ==
Following the end of a self-imposed 1948 freeze on issuing television station licenses by the Federal Communications Commission (FCC) in 1952, a realignment of future channel allocations took place, including the creation of ultra high frequency (UHF) allotments. In the combined Cleveland–Akron–Canton market, this resulted in multiple newly available UHF frequencies to complement the market's existing very high frequency (VHF) stations: WNBK, WEWS-TV and WXEL. Radio station WERE was the first in Cleveland to receive a construction permit for a UHF station on channel 65 on June 18, 1953, followed by WHK with a permit for a station on channel 19 that December. Neither were built, and the permits were revoked by the FCC on February 19, 1960.

United Artists Broadcasting, a subsidiary of the United Artists film studio, filed paperwork for a new channel 65 permit on March 22, 1963. Cleveland Telecasting Co., headed by WDBN owner Ted Niarhos, filed a competing application on May 3, 1963, having secured a lease to KYW AM/-TV's former transmitter facilities in Brecksville and promising a program lineup not constrained to a set schedule. Superior Broadcasting Corp. was next to file on September 17, 1963, led by Cleveland insurance executive and developer Frank V. Mavec, Leigh H. Perkins, and George Oliva, Jr. Mavec was additionally involved with Telerama Inc., an effort to have cable television franchises established in Cleveland, Akron, and other area suburbs. United Artists also applied for stations in Boston and Houston, but it had previously been subject to a civil antitrust lawsuit related to United States v. Paramount Pictures, Inc., which the FCC stated would reflect on "requisite qualifications" over the studio's fitness to own a television station.

During the comparative hearing, which began in late December 1963, a three-commissioner panel requested each of the three applicants demonstrate an ability to survive against established VHF competition over the first three years, in addition to providing detailed revenue estimates; this request was also made in similar hearings for competing applications in Buffalo and Boston. The FCC later enacted this as a revision to their financial qualification policy, a move to which Superior objected. United Artists removed itself from the hearing process on March 30, 1964, by amending their application to request channel 31 in Lorain, Ohio, which—like channel 65—was unused after WEOL failed to build out a prior permit for WEOL-TV. Concurrent with United Artists's request, Cleveland Telecasting withdrew their bid. Another revision to the table of UHF allocations by the FCC on June 4, 1965, had the channel 65 allocation moved to 61 (a frequency originally proposed for Akron), while channel 31 was moved to 43. With both companies being awarded permits in the spring of 1966, Superior requested the WAFT-TV call sign by early June.

On April 19, 1967, Superior announced a partnership with Oakland, California–based Kaiser Broadcasting, which would operate the new station under a new jointly owned company. Paperwork filed the following month had Superior transferring WAFT-TV's permit to WKBF Inc. for up to $200,000 (equivalent to $1.93 million in 2025) with Kaiser holding an option to become the full owner. Kaiser also provided $1 million to Superior and pledged an additional $1.5 million in financing. While Kaiser Broadcasting had been established a decade earlier with KHVH-TV in Honolulu, company founder and industrialist Henry J. Kaiser divested KHVH-TV, a VHF network affiliate, in favor of multiple UHF stations in large markets that could function as independents. By 1966, the Kaiser chain consisted of WKBD-TV in Detroit, WKBG-TV in Boston, KMTW-TV in Los Angeles (later renamed KBSC-TV), and WKBS-TV in Philadelphia, with KBHK-TV in San Francisco in the planning stages. The Superior-Kaiser alliance took advantage of a loophole in FCC regulations intended to limit one company from owning more than three television stations in the top 50 markets; WKBG-TV was also a 50–50 joint venture between Kaiser and The Boston Globe.

Granting a waiver to Kaiser, the FCC approved the 50 percent purchase of WAFT-TV in September 1967, with a call sign change to WKBF-TV; the call sign stood for the joint ownership of Kaiser Broadcasting and Frank Mavec. Kaiser also announced plans to launch a network among their station group by late 1970, with programs produced by stations within the Kaiser chain as the backbone. WKBF-TV was the first full-fledged independent station in Cleveland proper but the fourth full-power UHF station in the entire market, joining Akron's WAKR-TV, Canton's WJAN-TV, and NET member station WVIZ. Studios and offices were located at a former industrial building in Euclid, while the transmitter was sited in Parma. The station's lineup included classic reruns, cartoons, first-run movies and programs hosted by Jack LaLanne, Joe Pyne and David Susskind, along with local newscasts to be launched later in 1968.

Kaiser intended to have January 2, 1968, as WKBF-TV's launch date. This was the same date that KBHK-TV would sign on, and it was planned that senior Kaiser executives attend opening events in San Francisco and Cleveland on the same day. As late as December 29, WKBF ran newspaper advertisements proclaiming, "it happens this week on channel 61". While KBHK-TV signed on as scheduled, WKBF's launch would be repeatedly delayed due to inclement weather, in particular wind and extreme cold that prevented the completion of the transmitter tower and hookup to the electrical grid. A combination wind and sleet storm the weekend of January 13–14, 1968, pushed back the sign-on date by another week, as the tower was covered in ice. Channel 61 finally signed on with a test pattern on the evening of January 19, 1968, commencing regular telecasting the following day.

== Local programming ==
Kaiser committed to a substantial investment into local productions, not just at WKBF-TV, but throughout the entire chain, a practice largely appropriated from Metromedia's station group. The company invested over $36 million (equivalent to $333 million in 2025) into UHF broadcasting by 1968; a credo attributed to Henry J. Kaiser, "find a need and fill it", became the company slogan. General manager Jay Q. Berkson described this commitment as "...Kaiser (intending) to add a new dimension to local television ... TV should entertain, inform and enlighten its viewers". Kaiser's plans to network the most successful locally-produced shows from their station group distinguished their efforts from the United Network, which failed after one month of operation. Likewise, WKBF-TV carried weekly programs hosted by Hy Lit from Philadelphia and Lou Gordon from Detroit. Gordon's show, in particular, would be carried over the entire Kaiser group.

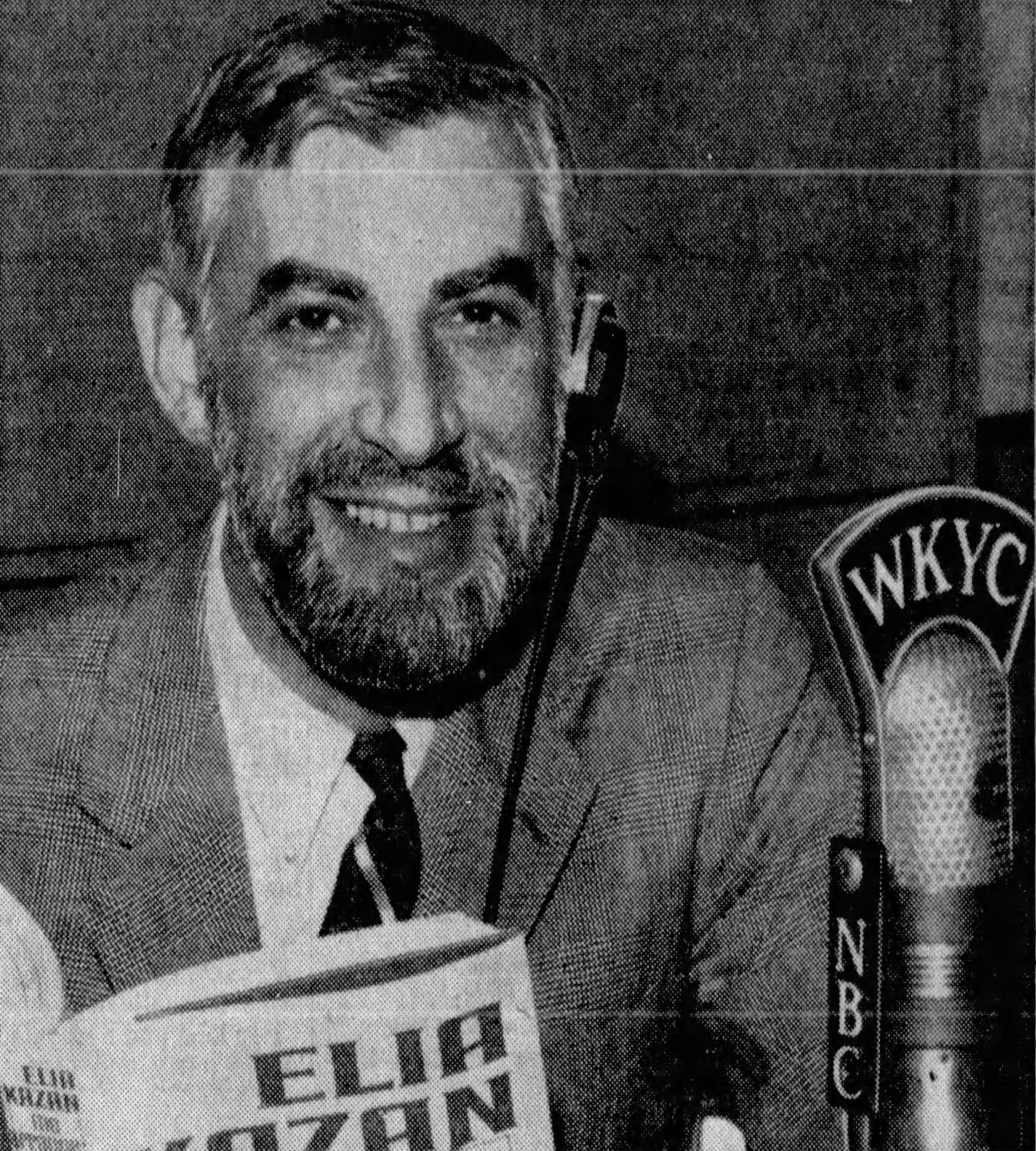
Alan Douglas

WKBF-TV's first local program began along with the station: a Saturday night panel discussion/talk show hosted by veteran radio host Alan Douglas, which was immediately picked up by KBHK-TV (and had originally been intended for that station's inaugural lineup). Titled The Alan Douglas Show, it served as an extension of his talk radio shows in both Cleveland and Pittsburgh. The program was best known for controversial topics and stances taken by Douglas meant to invoke passionate responses; a reviewer in The Plain Dealer regarded the show as "...the most stimulating discussion I have ever seen on TV". The debut episode alone elicited multiple complaints when guest Josiah Thompson discussed conspiracy theories related to the John F. Kennedy assassination. One 1969 installment, featuring a biker gang as guests, resulted in an on-air altercation with Douglas after he called them "criminals"; this continued after the program ended. In addition to KBHK-TV, the program was later syndicated to WKBS-TV and KBSC-TV but was cancelled in mid-April 1970.

Complementing an existing early-afternoon children's programming block (including the Hanna-Barbera catalogue, Astro Boy, The Three Stooges and Little Rascals, typical among the Kaiser chain) was Captain Cleveland, starring ventriloquist John Slowey and puppet sidekick "Private Clem". Captain Cleveland merited national attention when Cleveland mayor Carl Stokes began making regular appearances after rejecting prior offers by local media to host a program aimed at adults. Stokes's first appearance, talking to "Private Clem" about his mayoral duties while also responding to good-natured questions by the puppet, was so well-received that it became a regular segment, drawing comparisons to New York City mayor Fiorello La Guardia reading comic strips over the radio. In one installment, then-Vice President Hubert Humphrey appeared as a guest alongside Stokes. Berkson viewed the segment as "...(reaching) the kids before their ideas and prejudices develop". Stokes' telegenic style also found an unlikely supporter in comedian Bob Hope. Captain Cleveland aired on WKBF-TV through 1971, while John Slowey continued to make personal appearances for the station as late as 1973.

We will be able to write the rules as we go since we won't be saddled with stereotyped ways. We'll just tell the stories the way they are. We will be able to spend any amount of time on a story that it deserves.

— Matt Quinn, WKBF-TV news director

Kaiser announced the establishment of a news department for WKBF-TV in early May 1968, with the hiring of Matt Quinn from Pittsburgh's KDKA as news director, as part of a commitment Kaiser planned to execute at all their stations. WKBF-TV's news service would be centered around a nightly 10 p.m. newscast with a magazine-like format. The Ten O'Clock News debuted on August 12, 1968, anchored by former Kansas City newscaster John Herrington. Quinn expressed optimism that the Cleveland audience would be sophisticated enough to watch a late-evening newscast at an earlier hour. Prior to launching, WKBF-TV and WHK entered into a content-sharing partnership "combining" their respective news departments, with reporters from both stations, including WHK's John O'Day and Tim Taylor, exchanging stories and reports. Herrington began anchoring three news bulletins over WHK on weekday afternoons, while WHK news director Ken Hildebrand anchored WKBF-TV's weekend newscasts. Future Cleveland sportscaster Nev Chandler joined WKBF-TV in 1968 as an assignment editor after graduating from Northwestern University.

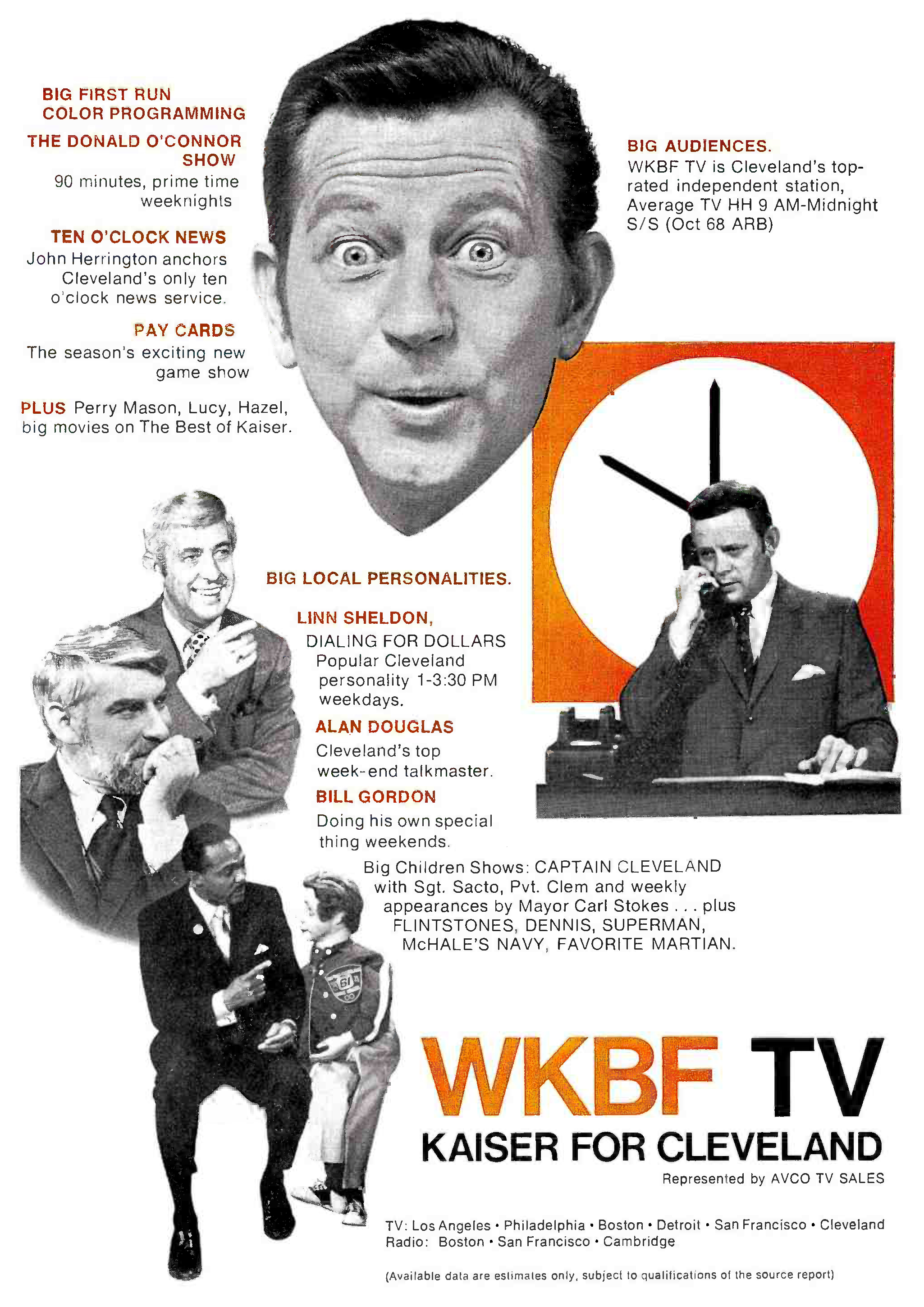
Industry advertisement for WKBF-TV in January 1969, marking the station's first anniversary.

Two other veteran broadcasters soon emerged at WKBF-TV during its first year. Bill Gordon, best known for co-hosting The One O'Clock Club at WEWS-TV with Dorothy Fuldheim, joined WKBF-TV in July 1968 to host the weekly variety show Dear Bill, which—like Douglas's show—had a studio audience, unique to Cleveland television. Linn Sheldon, who found fame as children's television host "Barnaby" for 13 years at KYW-TV/WKYC-TV, became an early-afternoon movie host at WKBF-TV the following month, dropping the characterization and used his real name. Sheldon also hosted local segments for the Jerry Lewis MDA Telethon, which WKBF-TV began carrying in 1969. Neither program lasted long: Gordon's program ended in April 1969, and Sheldon left that November to join WUAB, reprising the "Barnaby" persona.

Despite such lofty efforts, Kaiser Broadcasting faced mounting financial losses—compounded by a weak national economy and a marketplace slow to UHF acceptance—which threatened the company at large. From 1968 through 1970, a total of $6 million (equivalent to $49.7 million in 2025) was spent on the chain's news services, with WKBF-TV, WKBS-TV and WKBD-TV receiving the bulk of this investment, but WKBD-TV was the only Kaiser station to turn a profit. With declines in both advertisers and viewership in Cleveland and elsewhere, Kaiser eliminated news operations across the board on November 12, 1970. Defining this as "a period of hiatus" for newscast production, one staffer was retained at every station to be "...the nucleus for a larger staff when the hiatus has come to an end". Accordingly, WKBF-TV cancelled their 10 p.m. newscast and several public affairs programs that same day, saving $400,000 in expenses.

Kaiser's cutbacks promptly raised doubts in the industry over UHF's profitability, as Kaiser had been regarded as one of the better-equipped UHF station operators. WKBF-TV never reinstated its news department, with reporter Alan DePetro reassigned as public affairs manager, a role he held for the rest of the station's existence. John Herrington joined WKYC-TV the following January as a reporter and anchor, remaining at that station until retiring in 1993. Newsroom, an attempt at a replacement local newscast, began in 1971 but consisted of "rip-and-read" news wire stories and light discussion at 10:30 a.m.; Roldo Bartimole's newsletter Point of View noted, "even considering this program as news is rather stretching the definition of the word", while Cleveland Press critic Bill Barrett criticized the station for failing to employ an announcer at all times after an untrained engineer struggled to read a severe weather bulletin.

== UHF competition ==
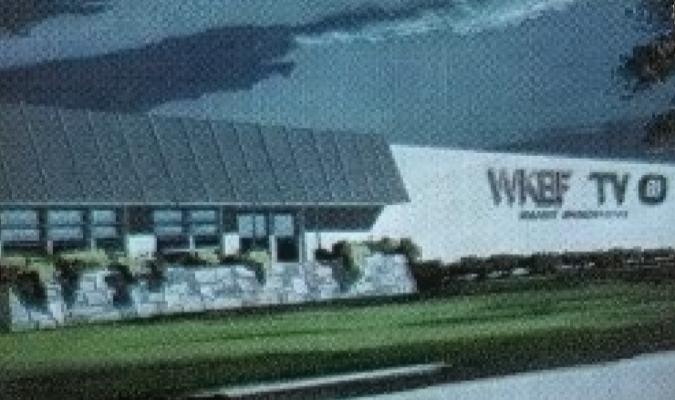
The former WKBF-TV studios in Euclid, Ohio.

WKBF-TV's success securing $700,000 (equivalent to $6.48 million in 2025) in advertising sales over the station's first few weeks of operation offered initial hope for long-time viability in the market, but the station was placed at a distinct disadvantage almost from the beginning. United Artists signed on WUAB on September 14, 1968, using WKBF-TV's transmitter tower in Parma, featuring a similar lineup of off-network reruns, cartoons, movies and sports. While WKBF-TV immediately launched with an array of local programming, WUAB's output was severely limited due to being temporarily housed at WVIZ's facilities in Brook Park and a semi-trailer next to a Parma bowling alley while their permanent studios were being built. In 1968, the combined Cleveland–Akron–Canton television market was ranked as the eighth-largest market in the United States, further attracting industry attention over competing UHF stations with substantial investment by their respective ownership.

By the spring of 1969, WUAB claimed a portion of WKBF-TV's viewership, taking advantage of poorly-rated syndicated variety shows at WKBF-TV hosted by Donald O'Connor and Les Crane, but both stations had taken a significant audience from the VHF competition. While WKBF-TV boasted coverage of the Cincinnati Royals and harness racing from Thistledown, WUAB-TV featured Ohio State Buckeyes football and men's basketball and Notre Dame Fighting Irish football. The arrival of "Barnaby" and Superhost (Marty Sullivan) at WUAB in late 1969, coupled with WKBF-TV culling much of their local offerings the following year, resulted in WUAB becoming by 1971 not only the leading UHF station in Cleveland but the second-highest rated UHF station in the country behind Boston's WSBK-TV. The differences between Cleveland's two UHF outlets soon became pronounced: William Hickey, a television columnist for The Plain Dealer, remarked that WKBF-TV "in no time ... was reduced to audience shares of 4%, and that was on good days." One bright spot for WKBF-TV occurred with reruns of the original Star Trek, which were broadcast in the same episode order as had been originally shown on NBC. Added to the station's schedule in September 1971 at 6:30 p.m. nightly, Star Trek quickly became channel 61's highest-rated program, so much so that a private celebration marking WKBF-TV's fifth birthday was headlined by DeForest Kelley.

On May 26, 1972, Kaiser Broadcasting and Field Communications, owner of WFLD-TV in Chicago, announced a transaction that had Field purchasing a 22.5 percent minority stake in the entire Kaiser station group (excluding KBSC-TV, which was to be divested); in turn, Kaiser purchased a 77.5 percent majority stake in WFLD-TV. Kaiser then executed the option to purchase the remainder of WKBF-TV from Superior Broadcasting, which the FCC approved on August 14, 1972. The Kaiser–Field deal was completed in early May 1973.

== The Ghoul ==
Of course the program director had to go back to his management and say that a guy in a lab coat full of buttons with a pair of glasses with one eye out and a wild wig was telling him he could double his ratings.

— Ron Sweed, on The Ghoul's debut

Even with the station's heavy emphasis on local programming in its first two years, WKBF-TV's most popular program debuted in 1971, after the majority of local output had been curtailed: Creature Features with The Ghoul. Ron Sweed originated the character as a spiritual successor to Ghoulardi, a horror host character created by Ernie Anderson at WJW-TV. At the age of 13, Sweed wore a gorilla suit to a promotional appearance for Ghoulardi, a stunt that led Sweed to be invited on stage by Anderson, eventually becoming his gofer. After Anderson left WJW-TV for work in Los Angeles, Sweed helped with succeeding show Hoolihan and Big Chuck then was granted permission by Anderson to portray the Ghoulardi character, but only under a different name. Only 21 years old when WKBF-TV debuted Creature Features, Sweed oriented The Ghoul to focus on explosions, slapstick and lowbrow humor, a marked departure from Ghoulardi's cerebral-driven beatnik persona. Sweed was occasionally criticized for being a poor imitation of horror hosts that preceded him, while one newspaper review called the show "one long Polish joke interrupted by a boring monster movie".

The Ghoul generated enough of a cult following to the point Kaiser syndicated the show to WKBD-TV in 1972, then KBHK-TV and WKBG-TV. While the program proved very popular in Cleveland and Detroit, it met with mixed results in San Francisco and Boston. WFLD-TV also picked up the program in late 1973, but it came at the expense of that station's existing horror host, Svengoolie (Jerry G. Bishop). Kaiser cancelled The Ghoul in the spring of 1975 due to being "economically unfeasible"; WKBF-TV and WKBD-TV were the only two remaining Kaiser stations carrying the show. WKBD-TV revived the program in August 1975, while Ron Sweed sued Kaiser for the intellectual property rights to the Ghoul character, to which Kaiser claimed it held the trademark. After prevailing in court, Sweed re-established the show at WXON in Detroit.

== Closure ==
A demand for any profit must be conceived by consumer demand. Then a second independent facility arrived in less than a year after our operation. We realized the serious jeopardy and knew that only one successful one must merge. We are now terminating broadcasting operations. On behalf of Kaiser Broadcasting and myself, thank you.

— Alan Bennett, WKBF-TV general manager

Kaiser Broadcasting, which operated WKBF-TV at a loss throughout its entire existence, announced the station's shutdown on April 8, 1975, after reaching a tentative agreement to sell WKBF's assets to United Artists in exchange for cash (Note: The cash value of WKBF-TV's assets were $350,000 (equivalent to $2.09 million in 2025) if the transmitter was included and $200,000 (equivalent to $1.2 million in 2025) if it was not. WUAB continued to operate from the transmitter tower it had shared with WKBF-TV until 2017, when the station sold off its broadcast spectrum back to the FCC.) or a 36 percent equity stake in WUAB while turning in WKBF-TV's license to the FCC for cancellation. Kaiser accepted the WUAB equity stake offer by mid-May. Rumors of such a transaction (reported on as a "merger") circulated several days earlier, with WUAB general manager Jack Moffitt and WKBF-TV general manager Alan B. Bennett acknowledging negotiations had been ongoing for "a couple of years". WKBF's final day of operations on April 25, 1975, ended after a Perry Mason rerun with a five-minute long tribute and a brief on-air statement by Bennett. Kaiser president Don B. Curran conceded the market could not support five commercial television stations and the shutdown was necessary to stabilize Kaiser's financial position, a statement echoed by Bennett.

The Press's editorial on WKBF's demise read, "[it] comes as a shock to those who have been led to believe that a television license is the equivalent of a license to print money. The sad truth is that, outside of the low number stations with their network affiliations, TV broadcasting is a tough business ... Channel 61 could not make ends meet." William Hickey noted in his Plain Dealer column that WUAB had nearly immediately entered the market with better programming, further dividing the audience for non-network fare; citing market conditions, he doubted that a new channel 61 would be constructed at any time in the near future, stating, "A child born today will have the proverbial gray beard before another commercial channel begins operating here." Press columnist Don Robertson criticized Kaiser vice president Richard Block's management of the station from Oakland, saying, "this Block knew about as much about the Cleveland TV market as I know about the sex habits of the Bulgarian wart hog."

WUAB replaced WKBF on cable systems in Zanesville and Dover/New Philadelphia, and the system in Fremont/Sandusky petitioned the FCC to replace WKBF with WKBD. One system in Circleville did not initially replace WKBF but noted the possibility of doing so at a future date. WKBF's studio building, which WUAB also purchased in the asset sale, was sold off and repurposed as an office building. Kaiser's equity stake in WUAB was divested in 1977 when Gaylord Broadcasting purchased WUAB from United Artists.

Several of the 65 staffers at WKBF-TV were reassigned throughout the Kaiser chain. Lucie Salhany, who had been a station employee at the start and end of WKBF-TV's on-air existence, continued with Kaiser as program manager for WLVI (the former WKBG-TV). Prior to being named the chairwoman of Fox in January 1992, Salhany explained that she joined that network "because I wanted to try and build something one more time ... The most fun I ever had was putting Channel 61 on the air. I was there when we signed on and there when we signed off. We worked hard and played hard, and those days were the best for me. I like 'build' situations and thought I'd try it here."

== Reuse of channel 61 ==
Hickey's prediction of a lack of interest in channel 61 proved unfounded, in large part because of the impending maturation of subscription television technology. In 1977, Cleveland Associates Company, a group of four Chicago companies, applied for the channel to run as a hybrid of ad-supported and subscription programming. The station went on the air on March 3, 1981, as WCLQ-TV; after the subscription programming proved a market failure and later owners were pushed into bankruptcy spending large sums on programming with little results, the Home Shopping Network purchased the station in 1986 and ran home shopping programming for 15 years as WQHS. As part of its purchase of the entire USA Broadcasting group, Univision converted the station to Spanish-language programming on January 14, 2002.
