= Arch MacDonald =

Boston based American broadcast journalist

Arch MacDonald

Arch MacDonald (July 18, 1911, in Fort Lauderdale, Florida – June 3, 1985, in Needham, Massachusetts) was an American broadcast journalist and television pioneer in Boston.

MacDonald started in broadcasting at WPRO (AM) in Providence, Rhode Island. He began working at WBZ (AM) radio in Boston in 1936. When WBZ-TV began television broadcasting in 1948 as an NBC affiliate, MacDonald was the station's first news anchorperson (not called that, as that term was not yet extant). He hosted the station's first broadcast, shown at 6:15 PM on June 9, 1948. Arch's signature sign off was "All of which brings us up to time".

In 1969, after two decades at WBZ-TV, MacDonald was recruited away by WKBG-TV (UHF channel 56) to host its new 10:00 PM newscast, Ten PM News, the first prime time newscast on a commercial television station in the Boston market. The program (which was the first on-air job for Natalie Jacobson) was not a financial success and WKBG-TV dissolved its news department at the end of 1970. MacDonald remained at the station for another year and hosted a weekday morning interview program.

MacDonald at one time or another worked for all three network-affiliated television stations in Boston, and several radio stations, in the course of his 54-year career. He worked up into the year of his death at 73, his last job being editorial director of WRKO radio in Boston.

MacDonald was elected to the Academy of New England Journalists in 1967, received the Governor's Award for lifetime achievement from the National Academy of Television Arts and Sciences in 1983, was honored at a 1984 ceremony at the John F. Kennedy Presidential Library and Museum, where a letter from Ronald Reagan describing MacDonald as "a Boston institution" was read, and was elected to the Massachusetts Broadcasters Hall of Fame in 2009.
