= KVEA =

Television station in Corona, California

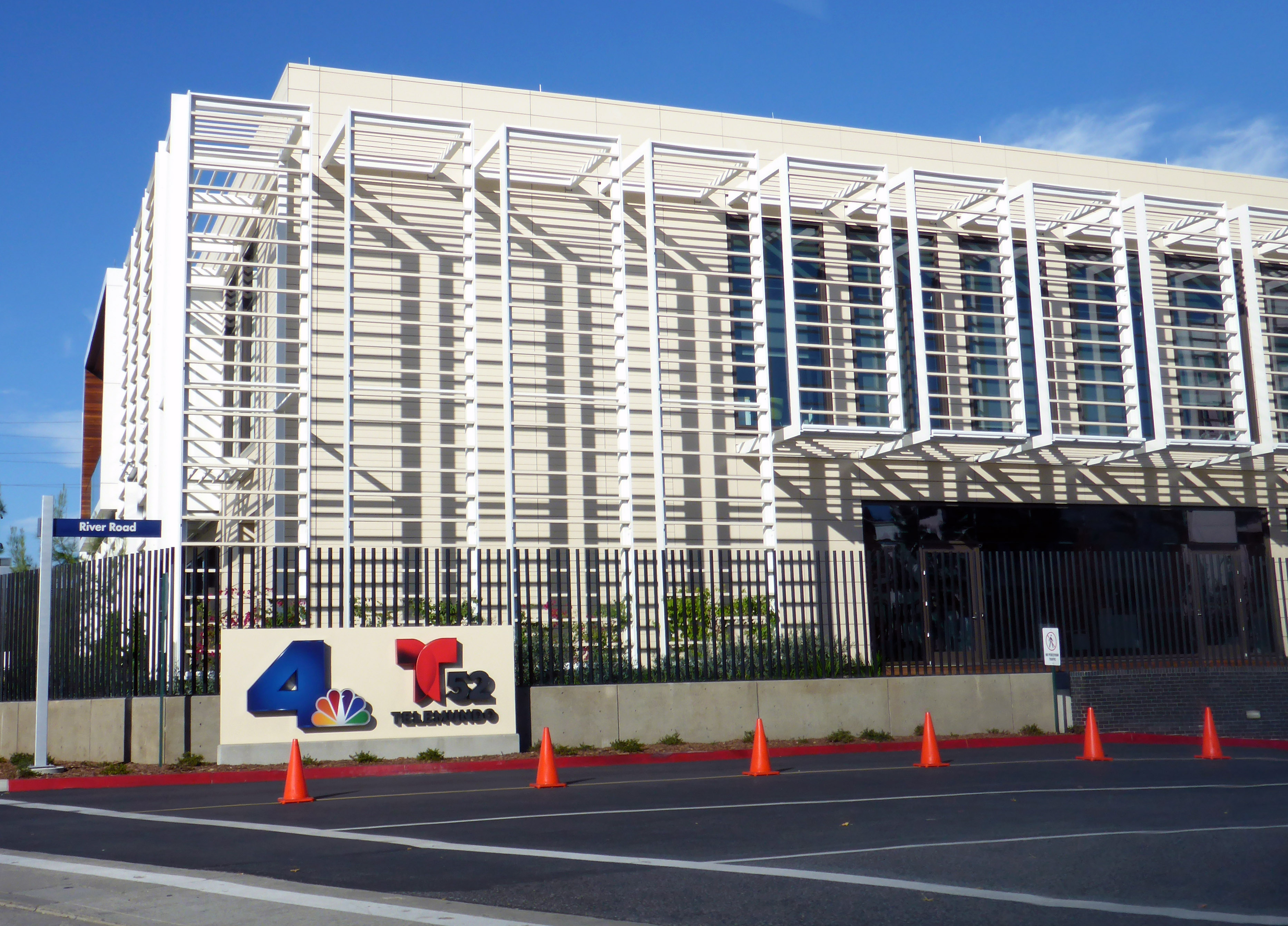
- Studio building shared by KNBC and KVEA
- Corona–Los Angeles, California; United States
- City: Corona, California
- Channels: Digital: 25 (UHF); Virtual: 52
- Branding: Telemundo 52

Programming
- Affiliations: 52.1: Telemundo; for others, see § Subchannels

Ownership
- Owner: Telemundo Station Group; (NBC Telemundo License LLC)
- Sister stations: KNBC

History
- First air date: June 29, 1966
- Former call signs: KMTW-TV (1966–1968); KBSC-TV (1968–1985)
- Former channel numbers: Analog: 52 (UHF, 1966–2009); Digital: 39 (UHF, until 2019)
- Former affiliations: Independent (1966–1982); ON TV (1977–1985); NetSpan (1985–1987)
- Call sign meaning: Vea is Spanish for "watch"

Technical information
- Licensing authority: FCC
- Facility ID: 19783
- ERP: 620 kW
- HAAT: 988.9 m (3,244 ft)
- Transmitter coordinates: 34°12′47.8″N 118°3′41″W
- Translator(s): K14AT-D Ridgecrest

Links
- Public license information: Public file; LMS
- Website: www.telemundo52.com

KVEA (channel 52) is a television station licensed to Corona, California, United States, serving the Los Angeles area. It is the West Coast flagship station of the Spanish-language network Telemundo, owned and operated by NBCUniversal's Telemundo Station Group alongside NBC West Coast flagship KNBC (channel 4). The two stations share studios at the Brokaw News Center in the northwest corner of the Universal Studios Hollywood lot off Lankershim Boulevard in Universal City; KVEA's transmitter is located atop Mount Wilson.

Channel 52 was established as KMTW, an independent station owned by Kaiser Broadcasting, which became KBSC-TV in 1968. Kaiser explored several pay television systems to operate using the station, but none materialized until Oak Industries acquired the station and made it the first and most successful operation in ON TV, boasting as many as 400,000 subscribers at its zenith. As subscription television declined, Oak sold KBSC-TV in 1985 to a group that relaunched it as Spanish-language KVEA and was instrumental in the foundation of Telemundo.

== History ==
=== Foundation ===
On November 14, 1962, the Federal Communications Commission (FCC) granted Kaiser Broadcasting, a division of Kaiser Industries, a construction permit for a new channel 52 television station to be licensed to Corona. The station, named KICB before construction, signed on as KMTW from studios and a transmitter on Mount Wilson on June 29, 1966.

Kaiser had developed a chain of independent television stations in large cities that generally lacked independent stations at the outset. The Kaiser independents in such cities as Detroit (WKBD-TV), Philadelphia (WKBS-TV), and Cleveland (WKBF-TV), for instance, were typically the first or second such non-network outlets in operation. Los Angeles presented a very different market with three network stations, four VHF independents already operating, and (with KMTW activated) four UHF stations. Kaiser knew it would need a different approach. Before signing on, it took an option on the Phonevision subscription television system developed by Zenith Electronics and licensed by Teco, gaining the right to use it in the Los Angeles market. However, Phonevision's ability to be used nationally and legal cases over subscription television in California had left the system unapproved by the time channel 52 started broadcasting. Instead, KMTW subsisted on public service films, travelogues, and other cheap fare.

On February 20, 1968, KMTW became KBSC-TV, representing its ownership (Kaiser Broadcasting) and region (Southern California). The Phonevision agreement expired in 1970, and the FCC gave approval the next year for Kaiser to begin using studios at 5746 Sunset Boulevard—Metromedia Square, home to KTTV.

The gulf between KBSC-TV and its sister stations grew wider. In August 1972, Kaiser transferred the licenses for five of its stations to a partnership with Field Communications, of which it would own 77.5 percent. KBSC-TV was held out of the joint venture because it was scheduled to be sold. Two months later, Kaiser announced it would seek to sell the station to the Pay Television Corporation in a transaction filed with the FCC in February 1973. The largest owner of Pay Television Corporation was Jean Marieanne McDonald. The application remained pending at the FCC for nearly two years; ultimately, the company opted to franchise its technology and not be a station owner, resulting in the purchase being canceled in February 1975.

=== The ON TV years ===
In December 1975, Kaiser filed to sell KBSC-TV to Oak Broadcasting Systems, a joint venture of television equipment manufacturer Oak Industries and Jerry Perenchio. The $1.2 million transaction, which closed the next year, set the course for channel 52 to become the first station in their planned subscription television venture, as Oak moved the studios from Metromedia Square to a site on Grand Central Avenue in Glendale.

On April 1, 1977, 500 test subscribers in the San Fernando Valley became the first customers of ON TV, a subscription service broadcast over KBSC-TV that offered unedited, uninterrupted motion pictures, as well as limited slates of Los Angeles Dodgers, California Angels, Los Angeles Lakers and Los Angeles Kings games, during evening hours. It was the second subscription television system in operation, with Wometco Home Theater having launched in New York City the previous month. Japanese- and Korean-language programs that were seen on channel 52 under leased-time arrangements migrated to a new station, KSCI (channel 18), when it launched on June 30; this allowed ON TV to air during evening hours beginning at 8 p.m.

ON TV proved to be a success in its early years of operation, and nowhere was this more apparent than in Southern California, despite the arrival of SelecTV on KWHY-TV (channel 22) the next year. By April 1979, the service was signing up 12,000 subscribers a month. By that year, it had grown its sports portfolio beyond the Dodgers, Angels, Lakers, and Kings to include USC Trojans college sports and Los Angeles Aztecs soccer, as well as horse racing from Santa Anita Park. The STV venture transformed Oak Industries itself. In 1979, the company moved its headquarters from Crystal Lake, Illinois, to the new planned community of Rancho Bernardo, California, to be closer to the entertainment industry.

Meanwhile, KBSC-TV changed its commercial program format to Spanish-language shows in 1980, airing 74 hours a week of commercial shows in Spanish and giving the market a second choice for Spanish-language viewing. Most of its Spanish-language shows, including news from Mexico, were sourced from Mexico's Canal 13.

ON TV grew nationally, with Oak and Chartwell developing operations separately, though the two remained partners in the Los Angeles operation. This arrangement, however, came into doubt in March 1981. The two sides disagreed over Perenchio's appointment of William M. Siegel, the chief executive of Chartwell, as the general manager of National Subscription Television—Los Angeles. Oak refused to consent to the appointment and claimed that Chartwell and Perenchio had "surreptitiously" placed Siegel on the payroll; it was reported that Oak had no dispute with Siegel but wanted to affirm its authority as 51 percent owner of the venture. Oak chairman Carter was surprised to learn that Siegel made more money than he did. Further, Perenchio drew Oak's ire when the Chartwell ON TV operation in Detroit ordered new decoder boxes from one of Oak's competitors.

Oak and Chartwell settled that September; the suit was dropped, and Oak bought out Chartwell's 49 percent share of National Subscription Television for $55 million. By May 1982, ON TV in southern California had reached its zenith—400,000 subscribers, representing two-thirds of Oak's base of some 600,000 paying customers in its five ON TV markets, not counting Detroit, Cincinnati, or Portland.

After the FCC repealed a rule in late 1982 that required television stations offering a subscription service to broadcast at least 20 hours a week of unencrypted programming, KBSC began running ON TV 24 hours a day and displaced its existing Spanish-language daytime programming. However, the STV industry took a national nosedive moving into 1983. A national recession and the increased penetration of multichannel cable television created new and immediate financial headwinds for Oak and ON TV. In March 1984, the company announced that it was being investigated by the Securities and Exchange Commission (SEC), and it posted a loss of $166.1 million for 1983. One of the company's auditors, Arthur Andersen, qualified its statement, fearing that Oak could not fully realize its $134 million investment in subscription television.

After having shuttered two ON TV operations in markets with combative station owners and high cable penetration—Dallas–Fort Worth and Phoenix—Oak moved to sell its station in the Miami market in 1984 to John Blair & Co., which planned Spanish-language programming. Oak intended to get out of Los Angeles next. In August—after a year of speculation—it emerged that Oak was in talks to sell the Los Angeles system to SelecTV, which had competed alongside ON TV for six years in the Southern California market. A deal was initially reached, then collapsed. However, SelecTV ultimately acquired the Los Angeles operation, by then with just 156,000 subscribers, in February 1985.

=== KVEA ===
The same month that Oak sold the ON TV subscriber base to SelecTV, the company reached a deal to sell KBSC-TV itself to an investor group, Estrella Communications, headed by former Brazilian television network head Joe Wallach, in a $30 million transaction.

Financially, the market is more than ripe for a second station. Our success does not have to come at the expense of Channel 34.

— Paul Niedermeyer, first general manager of KVEA

SelecTV programming aired for a time on KBSC while the new owners readied the station's next chapter, until October 11. On November 24, 1985, KVEA debuted. The new Spanish-language station sought to be an alternative to KMEX, the dominant outlet in southern California, with a wider range of U.S. and Latin American shows than KMEX's mostly Mexican fare and children's programming, as well as local news and a newsmagazine program.

The creation of a second Spanish-language network had first been mooted in 1984. NetSpan's founding affiliates were WNJU in New York, ethnic independent KSCI (channel 18) for the Los Angeles market, and Chicago's WBBS-TV. By 1986, KVEA had replaced KSCI (and WCIU-TV had entered in Chicago); the network offered three hours a day of programming plus specials.

Estrella Communications was a subsidiary of Reliance Capital Group, led by corporate raider Saul Steinberg. Less than a year after starting up KVEA, Reliance acquired John Blair & Co., which agreed to be purchased for $300 million to avoid a hostile takeover. The deal united KVEA with WSCV—the Miami-area station Oak had sold off two years prior—and WKAQ-TV in San Juan, Puerto Rico. In October 1986, Reliance then bought WNJU. On January 12, 1987, NetSpan became Telemundo, supplying additional programming and national news, which helped the station attract national advertisers.

The investment in KVEA quickly paid off. By February 1987, the 15-month-old operation had achieved a 34 percent share of the Spanish-speaking audience in Los Angeles, with the market having grown large enough that KMEX did not lose any of its audience. It covered community events in Spanish, produced 11 and a half hours of local news a week, aired a weekly half-hour highlight show of the Los Angeles Dodgers hosted by longtime Dodger Spanish-language voice Jaime Jarrín; furthermore, KVEA was the production base for new Spanish-language shows screened nationally, including La piñata de los $25,000 (The $25,000 Piñata), the first nationally syndicated Spanish-language game show.

At the end of the 1980s, KVEA came under some criticism for lack of representation of Mexicans—who comprised 90 percent of channel 52's viewership—in management. After Frank Cruz, a former KNBC news anchor who had been with the station since the 1985 launch, left in early 1989, three ranking Mexican staffers resigned together that June. The dispute escalated into calls by the National Hispanic Media Coalition for an advertising boycott of the station and picketing of its studios by protesters who felt the station favored Cubans in hiring and programming.

KVEA's next bout of station turmoil came in 1997. Between February and August, seven longtime staffers were dismissed for supposed budgetary reasons, though one anchor, Ana Cecilia Granados, alleged that new manager José Ronstadt had a bias toward Mexicans and ousted her for being Central American. Meanwhile, employees sought to unionize KVEA; they voted to form a union, but management refused voluntary recognition. With another boycott threatened, KVEA recognized the union in November 1997, right before the start of a ratings survey.

On January 15, 2001, KVEA launched an expanded news department, doubling its budget and its weekday output, as well as adding weekend news programs for the first time. The network then purchased KWHY-TV, its former pay TV competitor and later a Spanish-language independent, for $239 million in June 2001, creating a duopoly. Work was already underway on a comprehensive overhaul of channel 52's studios, and channel 22 was then integrated into the operation.

=== NBC acquisition ===
In October 2001, NBC announced it would buy Telemundo. The combination of the two parties owned three stations in the market; the FCC conditioned approval of the Telemundo acquisition on the divestiture of KWHY. Integration of the two operations took a major step forward in 2003, when 250 Telemundo employees moved to KNBC's studios in Burbank. KWHY sales and programming functions remained in Glendale while NBC fought for a waiver to keep all three stations; the next year, the FCC revised its media ownership rules to allow ownership of three stations in the largest markets. NBC would sell off KWHY in 2011 to the Meruelo Group as a condition of its merger with Comcast.

In 2007, NBC announced that it would move its Los Angeles local operation to a site at Universal Studios Hollywood. The complex was completed in 2014, with separate studios for KNBC and KVEA and a shared newsroom. Despite being an integrated operation, unlike at KNBC, KVEA's anchors and reporters remained non-union until voting 18–1 to unionize with SAG-AFTRA in January 2023.

On September 15, 2026, while covering a fatal crash involving a Los Angeles Metro bus and SUV in Chatsworth, a KNBC–KVEA helicopter operated by Angel City Air crashed, killing three people including both occupants in the helicopter and a pedestrian in a parking lot. The crash also injured one other person on the ground. KNBC–KVEA later identified that reporter Eliana Moreno and pilot George Marciniw were aboard the helicopter when it crashed. The crash is being investigated by the National Transportation Safety Board and the Federal Aviation Administration.

== News department ==
Local news programming on channel 52 began with the KVEA relaunch, in the form of a 15-minute program called VEA Noticias. One of the station's early coups was its coverage of the 1986 San Salvador earthquake, which drew new news viewers and started competition with KMEX. This quickly expanded into a full news service, and the station produced 11 and a half hours of local news a week by 1987.

From daily 6 and 11 p.m. news programs, KVEA added morning and midday newscasts when the news department expanded in January 2001, doubling its budget. In October 2001, a 5 a.m. newscast also debuted. In 2002, KVEA notched its first win at 11 p.m. since November 1993. Eduardo Quezada, who had worked for KMEX for 28 years and had previously been described as a Los Angeles institution at channel 34, resigned from his position at that station and joined KVEA in 2003, citing the attention NBC was giving the news department and its then-airing of six hours a day of local news, doubling KMEX's output. By 2007, Quezada had resigned to become the vice president of news and public relations for Una Vez Más Holdings.

In 2007, Los Angeles mayor Antonio Villaraigosa admitted that he had an extramarital affair with Mirthala Salinas, a KVEA reporter who at one time covered the political beat. The station suspended her for two months without pay for failing to disclose the conflict for interest and reassigned her to KVEA's bureau in Riverside. She failed to report to work there and left the company.

Cuts led to the removal of the morning newscast before it was reinstated in 2011 alongside the launch of a new weekly public affairs program. Beginning in 2014, a series of local news expansions at Telemundo added hours of news to KVEA's output. A 5:30 p.m. show debuted at KVEA and 13 other Telemundo stations on November 3, 2014. On September 26, 2016, a 5 p.m. half-hour was introduced.

=== Notable on-air staff ===
==== Current ====
- Dunia Elvir – news anchor

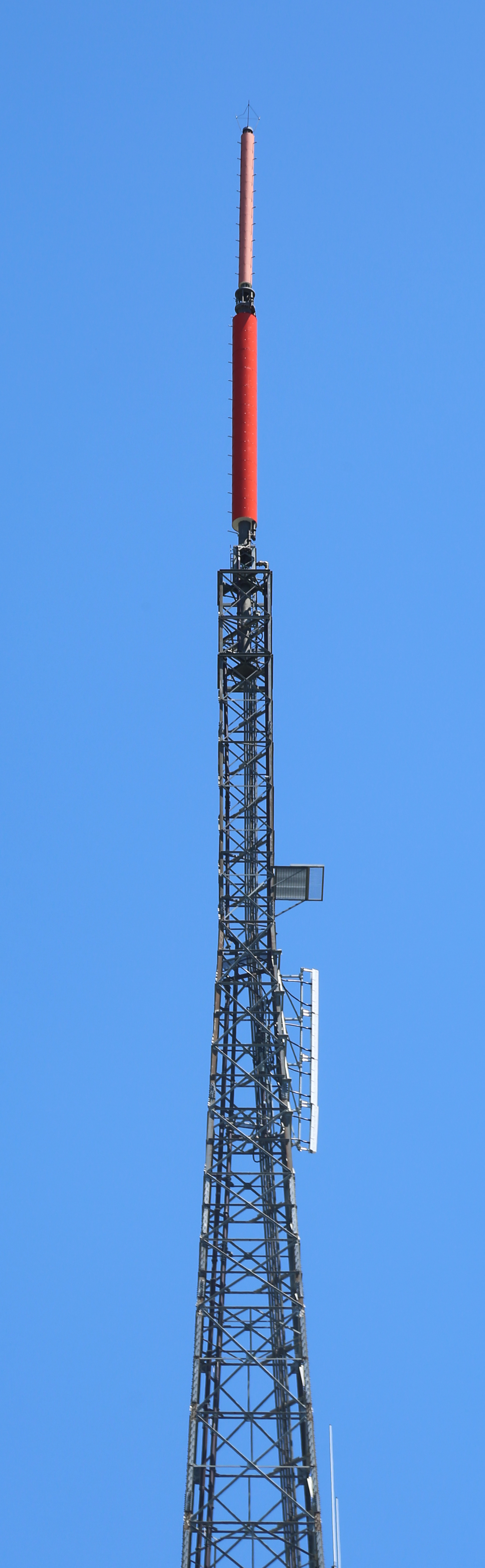
The KVEA (second from top) and KNBC (top) antennas share the same tower on Mount Wilson

==== Former ====
- Enrique Gratas – first news director, anchor, later of Ocurrió Así
- Adrián García Márquez – sports anchor (2002–2007)
- Raul Peimbert – anchor (2001–2002)

== Technical information ==
=== Subchannels ===
KVEA is broadcast from a transmitter atop Mount Wilson. The station's signal is multiplexed:

Subchannels of KVEA
Subchannel	Res.	Short name	Programming
52.1	1080i	KVEA-HD	Telemundo
52.3	480i	TelXtos	TeleXitos
52.4	480i	Cozi	Cozi TV

=== Analog-to-digital conversion ===
KVEA shut down its analog signal, over UHF channel 52, on June 12, 2009, as part of the federally mandated transition from analog to digital television; the digital signal remained on its pre-transition UHF channel 39, using virtual channel 52.

=== Translator ===
KVEA is rebroadcast on the following translator station:

- Ridgecrest: K14AT-D
