= Lucie Salhany =

American media executive

- Born: Lucille Susan Mady; May 25, 1946 (age 80); Cleveland, Ohio U.S.
- Other names: Lucie Mady Salhany; Lucille Salhany Polcari
- Occupation: Media executive
- Years active: 1967-present
- Spouse: John Polcari
- Children: 2
- Parent(s): Haliam Jacob Mady; Matilda Thomas Mady

Lucille "Lucie" Salhany (Arabic: لوسي صالحاني; born May 25, 1946) is an American media executive of Jordanian and Lebanese Heritage. Salhany was the first woman to head a broadcast television network in 1993 in the position as Chairwoman of Fox Broadcasting Company. She later created the United Paramount Network. She has had over 30 years of experience in the entertainment business, and during the height of her career, was one of the most powerful women at the C-Suite level.

== Early life ==
Salhany was born in Cleveland, Ohio, to a Jordanian father and a Lebanese mother. Her parents owned a grocery store in Cleveland.

Salhany graduated from Brush High School in Lyndhurst, Ohio, in 1964. Salhany attended Kent State University but after dropping out at age 19, she did not continue her education after more than a year.

== Career ==
=== TV Broadcasting ===
In 1967, Salhany got a job as a secretary to the Program Manager at an independent TV station in Cleveland called WKBF-TV. She was continuously promoted, and after training by her boss, when she was 24, she took over his position as Program Manager of the station. In 1975, Salhany became program manager of the Boston TV station, WLVI-TV.

In 1979, Salhany become Vice President for Programming for Taft Broadcasting Company in Philadelphia, Pennsylvania. Salhany was responsible for bringing then local Chicago talk-show host, Oprah Winfrey to Taft in a syndication deal. Salhany also championed "The Arsenio Hall Show," "Hard Copy" and "Entertainment Tonight.”

In 1985, Salhany moved to Paramount Domestic Television in Los Angeles as president and supervised the production of shows like Entertainment Tonight, The Arsenio Hall Show, Hard Copy, and Star Trek: The Next Generation.

=== FOX ===
In 1991, former Paramount colleague and newly hired FOX Broadcasting CEO Barry Diller asked Salhany to become Chairman of Twentieth Television. When Diller was fired four months later, Rupert Murdoch gave her Diller's job. The position was Chairman of FOX Network.

In 1993, Salhany was responsible for the development the late night show, The Chevy Chase Show, but it was canceled after 6 weeks on air, and was not well received by critics or affiliates alike. The canceled show cost the network tens of millions of dollars. Although Salhany took the network from four nights of programming to seven nights of programming, and was responsible for creating the TV show, The X-Files, which was very successful, and brought the NFL to the network, she left after three and a half years on her five-year contract, saying that Murdoch breached terms of her contract by not maintaining reporting structure. Salhany claimed Murdoch, in meetings in front of others, asked if she was a "fem-Nazi" and what her husband would think of things.

=== UPN ===
She moved back to Paramount as they were about to launch the United Paramount Network, also known as the UPN—which later merged with The WB. Salhany was Chief Executive Officer of UPN from 1995 to 1997.

In 1997, after leaving UPN, Salhany moved to Boston, where her husband, a restaurateur, is based, and started a media consultancy business called JH Media. She told Variety in 2001: "It was time I left L.A." She explained that she was done with the TV business. “Television has changed from what it was,” she said. “I don’t want to be one of those people who look back and say ‘do you remember the good old days?’"”

From 1999 to 2002, Salhany was President/Chief Executive Officer of LifeFX Networks, Inc., a publicly held company that developed and patented technologies around their proprietary avatar technology they called “stand-ins." A stand-in could produce a video-like rendering of a talking human with audio perfectly in sync with moving lips and facial gestures. The stand-ins were also leveraged to create “Facemail,” which allows users to send email with an audio message read to the recipient by a stand-in. Importantly, the stand-in technology was secured using Digital Rights Management (DRM) technology so that stand-in owners could control what their stand-ins were allowed to say.

In 2003, Salhany co-founded Echo Bridge Entertainment, LLC.

=== Hewlett-Packard ===
Salhany joined the Hewlett-Packard (HP) Board of Directors in January 2002, in connection with the acquisition of Compaq Computer Corporation. In 2002, she also became a member of the HR and Compensation Committee.

Salhany was appointed to the Audit Committee in September 2006. In the same month, she became the Chair of the Nominating and Governance Committee.

As a result of new leadership and heavy criticism of HP’s board, Salhany left HP’s board in 2011. Leo Apotheker took over as chief of HP in November 2010 and brought in five new directors to diversify leadership.

Leading up to Salhany’s departure, the HP board faced shareholder lawsuits and received criticism from analysts and shareholders, over the hiring of Apotheker. Of the 12-member board who voted to hire Apotheker, the majority of board members had never met Apotheker.

== Leadership ==
- ALSAC/St. Jude Children's Research Hospital, Professional Advisory Board Member
- American Media, Inc., Director
- 1997-2002: Compaq Computer Corporation, Board Member until its merger with Hewlett-Packard Company in 2002
- 2002-2011: Hewlett-Packard Company, Board Member
- Emerson College, Trustee
- ION Media Networks, Board Member
- Lasell College, Advisory Council
- Screens Entertainment Association, Board Member

== Awards ==
- 1992: ALSAC/St. Jude Children's Research Hospital, Honorary Doctor of Humane Letters
- 1993: Broadcasting & Cable Hall of Fame
- 1995: American Jewish Committee, Sherrill C. Corwin Human Relations Award (first female recipient)
- 1995: American Women in Radio and Television, Silver Satellite Award
- 1996: Caucus for Producers, Writers & Directors, Executive of the Year
- 1997: HELP Humanitarian Award
- 1997: Cable Financial Management Organization, Avatar Award
- National Academy of Television Arts and Sciences, Silver Circle Award
- 2013: Lasell College, Honorary Doctor of Humane Letters

== Personal life ==
Salhany is married to Boston restaurateur John Polcari, Jr. of Regina Pizzeria and Polcari's. They have two sons, Hal and Jake, whom they adopted from Beirut, Lebanon. She was previously married in the late 1960s.
