= WKBS-TV (Philadelphia) =

Television station in Burlington, New Jersey (1965–1983)

- Station logo used under Field
- Burlington, New Jersey; Philadelphia, Pennsylvania; United States
- City: Burlington, New Jersey
- Channels: Analog: 48 (UHF)

Programming
- Affiliations: Independent

Ownership
- Owner: Kaiser Broadcasting (1965–1977); Field Communications (1977–1983)

History
- First air date: September 1, 1965
- Last air date: August 30, 1983
- Call sign meaning: "Kaiser Broadcasting System"

Technical information
- Facility ID: 21425
- ERP: 2,090 kW
- HAAT: 335 m (1,100 ft)
- Transmitter coordinates: 40°02′37.4″N 75°14′30.6″W

WKBS-TV (channel 48) was a television station licensed to Burlington, New Jersey, United States. Operating from September 1965 to August 1983, it was one of three major independent stations serving the Philadelphia metropolitan area. Though licensed to Burlington, its studios and transmitter were located within Philadelphia city limits—in South Philadelphia and the Roxborough tower farm, respectively.

WKBS-TV was constructed by Kaiser Broadcasting as the second in a chain of major-market UHF independent TV stations. It offered movies, syndicated reruns, children's and sports programs, and briefly a 10 p.m. local newscast. From Philadelphia, a teen dance program hosted by local radio personality Hy Lit was syndicated to all of Kaiser's stations. Though the station was a perennial money-loser for most of its first decade in operation, its fortunes improved in the mid-1970s, and it spent six seasons as the television broadcaster of the Philadelphia 76ers basketball team.

Kaiser sold a minority stake in its television stations to Field Communications in 1973; Field acquired Kaiser outright in 1977. A family feud over control of the Field business empire led to the decision in 1982 to place all of the company's stations on the market. No buyer came through with a satisfactory purchase price, which prompted the liquidating firm to close the station down and sell it for parts in its shareholders' best interests. WKBS-TV made its last broadcast on the morning of August 30, 1983; some equipment and most of its programming were purchased by one of its competitors, WPHL-TV, while other items were auctioned.

In the years following the closure of WKBS-TV, Philadelphia regained a third full-market independent in 1985 with the conversion of subscription-based WWSG into WGBS-TV, owned by Milton Grant. The process to award channel 48 in Burlington to a new bidder spanned the rest of the decade; Dorothy Brunson, a Black radio station owner, received a construction permit in 1989 and built WGTW-TV in 1992.

== Construction and early years ==
On August 31, 1962, Kaiser Industries, the conglomerate owned by California industrialist Henry J. Kaiser, applied to the Federal Communications Commission (FCC) for three new UHF TV stations: channel 38 in Chicago; channel 41 in Burlington, New Jersey (to serve Philadelphia); and channel 50 in Detroit. This was the second application by Kaiser Broadcasting for TV stations on the U.S. mainland: it already owned stations in Hawaii and had requested UHF channels in the Los Angeles and San Francisco areas. Richard C. Block, the president of Kaiser Broadcasting, told Broadcasting magazine that the company had "an abiding faith that there is right now a need for additional TV service ... and UHF obviously provided the opportunity". The applications called for a general-appeal program lineup, local and live talent, and local news.

In granting the construction permit on July 8, 1964, the FCC reserved the right to change Kaiser's allotted channel and did so in May 1965, substituting channel 48 for 41. The call letters WKBP (Kaiser Broadcasting/Philadelphia) were originally assigned, but Kaiser changed to WKBS on December 31, 1964, because it was too hard to say.

WKBS made its broadcasting debut on September 1, 1965, with the children's program Dickory Doc. The station's first day on air featured Gene Kelly, head of its sports staff, delivering sports news; a roller derby game; and another children's show, Captain Philadelphia. That Saturday, the station debuted 48 A Go-Go, a teen dance program hosted by WIBG radio personality Hy Lit. Though WKBS-TV was licensed to Burlington, New Jersey, its physical plant was entirely in Philadelphia; its studios were located at 3201 South 26th Street in South Philadelphia, and its transmitter was located on the Roxborough tower farm in Philadelphia. Kaiser's new Philadelphia-area station formed part of a stampede of new independent outlets in the area in 1965. Channel 29 was the first to appear as WIBF-TV on May 16, and on September 17, channel 17 returned from a three-year silence as WPHL-TV. In American Research Bureau's December 1965 ratings report, after a correction that cost the company tens of thousands of dollars, WKBS and WPHL each had enough audience to show in the survey, with channel 48 leading channel 17.

Drawing on the sports formula that made Kaiser's WKBD-TV successful from its launch earlier in the year, taped replays of local college and high school football games formed part of WKBS's lineup, and in January 1966, the station began airing live wrestling from the Hotel Philadelphia ballroom. By 1966, Stu Nahan was channel 48's sports director, simultaneously serving as an announcer on Philadelphia Eagles football games. Nahan was also the first television voice for the expansion Philadelphia Flyers hockey team, which debuted in 1967 with their games on WKBS.

In 1966, Hy Lit began appearing on Kaiser's stations in Detroit (WKBD-TV) and Boston (WKBG-TV). (Note: The article, dated September 6, comes months before WKBG-TV went on the air.) In turn, WKBS-TV aired programs originating from the other Kaiser stations. Among these was The Lou Gordon Program from WKBD; in a controversial 1972 episode, Philadelphia mayor Frank Rizzo, frustrated with Gordon's line of questioning, walked out of the interview. During the late 1960s, Kaiser harbored ambitions of setting up its own television network, primarily consisting of the best programs produced at its individual stations. WKBS would later produce for the entire Kaiser chain a series of "Mininews" news capsules for use during children's programming.

Kaiser made a $2 million annual commitment beginning in 1967 to launch local news departments in its station portfolio. News came to WKBS-TV on March 18, 1968, with the launch of the Ten O'Clock News, hosted by Doug Johnson. Jim Vance, who later had a lengthy career in TV news in Washington, D.C., was a reporter for WKBS-TV from 1968 to 1969. Kaiser's commitment to news programming groupwide wavered, sometimes in the span of months. In April, seven of twenty-one employees in the news department were dismissed; the group then began expanding programming again, encouraged by ratings success at its Cleveland and Detroit stations. The newscast was relaunched with a dual-anchor format as "The Grant and Grady 10 O'Clock Report", hosted by market broadcast veteran Joe Grady and news director Carl Grant. Ultimately, the entire news operation was closed after only two years, due to a weak economy and reluctance to embrace UHF stations.

== Field ownership ==
Kaiser Broadcasting sold a minority 22.5 percent stake in its holdings (excluding KBSC-TV in Los Angeles and Kaiser's radio stations) to Field Communications on May 26, 1972, concurrent with Kaiser purchasing a majority 77.5 percent stake in Field's Chicago station, WFLD-TV. Kaiser sold the group to Field outright in January 1977 for a combined $42.625 million (equivalent to $226 million in 2025) as part of a larger disposition of Kaiser Industries's assets.

During the mid-1970s, WKBS shed its perennial status as a money-loser. In 1973, general manager William Ryan told Variety that the station had lost a "helluva lot of money" in its entire existence. Under the management of Robert L. Bryan, the station acquired stronger programming, including Mary Hartman, Mary Hartman and the ABC drama The Edge of Night, which local affiliate WPVI-TV did not air. It swung from a loss to a $400,000 annual profit before Bryan was removed by Kaiser management in early 1976. By the late 1970s, the competition in the independent station market in Philadelphia was starting to favor channel 29, by this time known as WTAF-TV, which edged ahead of WKBS and WPHL in the ratings.

Channel 48 continued to mix movies, series, children's programs, and sports. In 1975, Bill "Wee Willie Webber" left WPHL-TV to host children's shows for WKBS-TV; he lasted three years on the station. Between 1976 and 1982, when it was outbid by WPHL, channel 48 was the broadcast home of the Philadelphia 76ers basketball team. After the Sixers moved to WPHL, the station signed a deal to carry a package of 25 Big 5 college basketball games, mostly away contests, which represented the city schools' largest television exposure in years. The station added a five-minute newsbreak at 10:55 p.m. to its schedule and two earlier news updates in 1981, the only such programming on Philadelphia's three UHF independents.

== Closure ==
In 1982, a bitter dispute over the operation of Field Communications between brothers Marshall Field V and Frederick W. Field resulted in the liquidation of their company, including its broadcasting interests. Over the course of 1983, the Field stations were sold: WFLD-TV went to Metromedia in a record-setting transaction, United Television acquired KBHK-TV in San Francisco, WLVI (the former WKBG-TV) was acquired by Gannett, and Cox Broadcasting purchased WKBD-TV. While many larger broadcast groups were interested in the station, and channel 48 was profitable, none were willing to pay Field's asking price of at least $25 to $40 million. The low offers led Field to conclude that shareholders would be better served donating WKBS-TV or selling it for parts than as a going concern. The Annenberg School of Communication at the University of Pennsylvania was offered the station by Field; the idea was unanimously rejected. Dean George Gerbner later told The Philadelphia Inquirer, "We needed a money-losing television station like we needed a hole in the head" and that the university "wanted no part of a tax dodge".

Facing a deadline to close down the company, Field announced on July 15, 1983, that it would shut down WKBS-TV at the end of August. The news stunned employees, who expected the station to be sold. The final telecast came on the morning of August 30, after a syndicated college football game, the Kickoff Classic between Penn State and Nebraska. General manager Vince Barresi delivered a final editorial—a eulogy for WKBS:

Tonight completes the last day of the broadcasting operations of WKBS-TV, channel 48, Field Communications Burlington–Philadelphia. On July 15, Field Communications announced that it would cease operation of the station and that the license to operate channel 48 would be returned to the Federal Communications Commission.

Channel 48 began its broadcast operations on September 1, 1965, under the ownership of Kaiser Broadcasting. Through those eighteen years of operation, we have endeavored to best serve all interests of the Delaware Valley. The commitment of all of our station's employees has been dedicated to you, our viewers. Over the years, we have presented all types of programs to the people of the Delaware Valley. Channel 48's efforts have been recognized by many broadcast professional awards, and more importantly, by our viewers. Channel 48 as an entity, and our employees as individual citizens, have been deeply involved in our community; we have been unselfish over the years by giving literally thousands of hours of personal time to make the Delaware Valley an even better place in which to live.

We hope you enjoyed tonight's Penn State–Nebraska football game. I am sure you can appreciate that this is a sad day for all of us at channel 48. However, we take great pride in knowing that we have been of service to you over the past eighteen years. Since the announced closing of our operation, we have received numerous letters and phone calls of support. For that, we are most appreciative. We, the people of WKBS will all go forward in our new careers, and I can assure you that we will always have the people of the Delaware Valley in our hearts. Thank you, good night, and God bless you all.

The message from Barresi was followed by a video set to a few instrumental lines of "Auld Lang Syne" and the last few lines of Simon and Garfunkel's "The Sound of Silence". The station then left the air at 12:49 a.m. Eighty-two staffers lost their jobs; roughly a quarter had found other jobs by the time of the closure.

== Disposition ==
As part of the closure, the Providence Journal Company, owner of WPHL-TV, acquired $500,000 in equipment from WKBS, including four one-inch video tape machines. WPHL-TV, which had been running third among the independents, sought to bolster its programming lineup by taking over programming contracts belonging to channel 48 and came away with the vast majority of its programs. The Big 5, which had been days away from signing a renewal of its college basketball contract with channel 48 for the 1983–84 season, wound up with just five games telecast on the New Jersey Network. In January 1984, an auction was held for broadcast equipment and some 300 items of office furniture at the studio building.

The Philadelphia area had gained two television stations in the early 1980s, both of which originally broadcast subscription television programs. After WRBV-TV in Vineland, New Jersey, lost its contract to carry WHT programming in 1984, it became a conventionally programmed independent station as WSJT under the ownership of a division of the Asbury Park Press newspaper. In 1985, Philadelphia-based subscription station WWSG-TV was sold to Milton Grant and relaunched as WGBS-TV "Philly 57"; its first major sports rights acquisition was Villanova University basketball, which had gone unaired since channel 48 folded. A third station briefly joined the independent station marketplace in July 1986 as WTGI went on the air from Wilmington, Delaware. It was beset with delays which sapped its working capital; WGBS-TV left no room for the new station in the market. WTGI switched to home shopping programming in November. WSJT would join it after the Press sold the station to the Home Shopping Network in December 1986.

=== Replacement on channel 48 ===
The battle to replace WKBS on channel 48 in Burlington, New Jersey, lasted for years. Eleven applications were designated for hearing in September 1984; at least one applicant withdrew its bid because of the arrival of WGBS-TV, which took up much of the available programming in the Philadelphia market. The FCC selected the application of Dorothy Brunson, an African-American radio station owner from Baltimore, in February 1986. Cornerstone Television, a Christian broadcaster that at one point sought channel 48, purchased channel 48's transmitter and tower, moved them to Altoona, and used them to sign on a new station in 1985 on channel 47, using the WKBS-TV call letters.

Brunson signed her station on as WGTW-TV on August 13, 1992. The station carried on as an independent for more than a decade before being sold to the Trinity Broadcasting Network in October 2004.
