= Dale Dorman =

American DJ

Dale Dorman (September 2, 1943 – October 21, 2014) was an American Rock and Roll Hall of Fame radio disc jockey on WODS in Boston. Until September 15, 2008, he hosted The Breakfast Club with Dale Dorman weekday mornings from 5:30-9 AM. Dorman finished his career as a weekend personality with the station. "Uncle Dale" was inducted into the Massachusetts Broadcasting Hall of Fame in 2010.

Dorman broadcast in Boston for close to 40 years, starting on WCHN AM/FM (Norwich, New York) doing an afternoon rock show, then going to WOLF (Syracuse, New York 1965), KYNO (Fresno, California) 1965-1966, KFRC (San Francisco) 1966-1968, WRKO (Boston) 1968–78, and later on WXKS-FM (1978–2003). He joined WODS during the summer of 2003.

In the 1970s and 1980s, Dorman was also an on-air announcer for television on WLVI-TV, Boston for children's programming as "Uncle Dale", and occasionally for the channel's Saturday afternoon Creature Double Feature showcase of syndicated monster movie presentations.

Dorman died October 21, 2014.

In 2026, Dorman was inducted into the Radio Hall of Fame in the "Legends" category.
