= Kaiser Broadcasting =

American broadcasting company

Kaiser Broadcasting Corp.
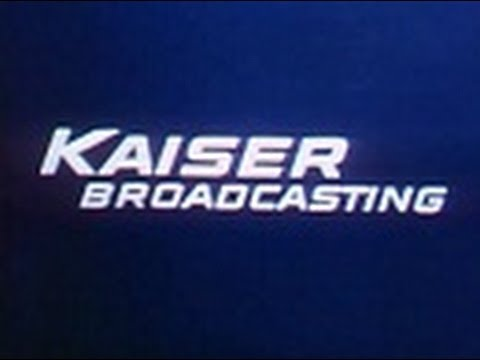
- Type: Subsidiary
- Industry: Television
- Founded: 1957; 69 years ago
- Founder: Henry J. Kaiser
- Defunct: 1977; 49 years ago
- Fate: sold to Field Communications
- Headquarters: Oakland, California, U.S.; San Francisco, California, U.S.
- Key people: Richard Block; VP, GM; Don B. Curran, President
- Parent: Kaiser Industries
- Divisions: Kaiser Broadcasting Company

The Kaiser Broadcasting Corp. was an American broadcast media company that owned and operated television and radio stations in the United States from 1957 to 1977.

== History ==
=== Creating a broadcast chain ===
Kaiser's involvement in broadcasting began in 1957 when the Henry J. Kaiser Company Ltd., a multi-industrial conglomerate led by the eponymous industrialist, signed on KHVH and independent KHVH-TV (channel 13) in Honolulu, Hawaii, within two months of each other. Both stations were located in the Hawaiian Village Hotel, which Kaiser also owned and from which the call sign was derived. Kaiser purchased KULA-TV (channel 4) on May 8, 1958, changed its calls to KHVH-TV on July 16, 1958, and returned the original KHVH-TV license to the Federal Communications Commission (FCC). Kaiser also acquired San Francisco station KBAY-FM in 1960, renaming it KFOG-FM and implementing a beautiful music format.

Later in the 1960s, Kaiser explored new opportunities to expand its broadcast holdings on the U.S. mainland: construction permits were secured for multiple ultra high frequency (UHF) stations, all in large markets, and KHVH-TV was sold off to help fund this expansion. The first two of these stations signed on during 1965: WKBD-TV in Detroit went on the air in January, followed nine months later by WKBS-TV in Burlington, New Jersey, a suburb of Philadelphia. WKBD-TV's debut was auspicious as the station's schedule consisted entirely of live sports play-by-play, a first in American broadcasting.

KMTW-TV took to the air in the Los Angeles market on June 29, 1966. Later renamed KBSC-TV, this station proved to be a weak point in the chain after failing to attain a local Phonevision franchise and became uncompetitive against the market's established seven other independent stations both on VHF and UHF. Also in June 1966, Kaiser purchased the broadcast assets of Harvey Radio Laboratories, including WXHR AM/FM/TV. The television station had been off the air since 1956 but the license remained active and was purchased by Harvey Radio in 1959. The Boston Globe then purchased a 50 percent stake in the Boston stations, creating a 50–50 joint venture that took advantage of a loophole in a proposed FCC rule limiting one ownership group to no more than three television stations in the top 50 markets. The television station was reactivated as WKBG-TV on December 21, 1966.

Kaiser started up two more stations, KBHK-TV in San Francisco and WKBF-TV in Cleveland, at the start of 1968. The company intended to have both stations sign on at the same time on January 2, 1968, and arranged for executives to be present at both facilities for the occasion, but repeated construction delays at the transmitter site due to inclement weather prevented WKBF-TV from signing on until January 19. Like WKBG-TV, WKBF-TV was jointly owned by Kaiser and Superior Broadcasting Company (which attained the station's construction permit) for its first four years of operation, but was formally recognized as "a Kaiser station" equally taking advantage of the FCC's aforementioned "top 50 market" ownership limit. The Globe reduced its ownership stake in the Boston stations to 10 percent, also in 1968.

=== Growing financial problems ===
In September 1967, the Kaiser Broadcasting Corporation announced plans for live television network operations by 1970. Excluding KBSC-TV, all stations in the Kaiser chain placed a significant emphasis on local programming, with some of the more popular programs syndicated to other Kaiser stations. These included shows hosted by Joe Dolan in San Francisco, Alan Douglas in Cleveland, Hy Lit in Philadelphia and Lou Gordon in Detroit. Gordon's WKBD-TV show proved to be the most successful, with all the Kaiser stations eventually carrying the program. This internal networking practice continued into the mid-1970s when "The Ghoul", a WKBF-TV horror host portrayed by Ron Sweed, was syndicated to WKBD-TV, WKBG-TV, KBHK-TV and later WFLD-TV (the latter after Kaiser purchased majority control).

Beginning in 1968, Kaiser committed to launching news services throughout the chain, many of which boasted late-evening newscasts an hour earlier than network affiliates. Kaiser invested approximately $6 million (equivalent to $49.7 million in 2025) into these news departments, with emphasis given to WKBF-TV, WKBS-TV and WKBD-TV; WKBG-TV's news operation was the last to launch on December 1, 1969, while KBHK-TV's attempt at a 10 p.m. newscast failed earlier in the year. The high costs incurred, in addition to a weak economic picture nationally and a marketplace reluctant to embrace UHF, led Kaiser to suspend news operations throughout the entire chain on November 12, 1970. Out of the five stations with a news department, only WKBD-TV turned a profit but still had ratings much lower than had been expected. WKBG-TV's picture was especially dire, having lost nearly $11 million over the course of four years. The unilateral move to cull local newscasts was met with doubts and concerns in the industry over the profitability of UHF stations given Kaiser's reputation as a well-equipped broadcaster.

=== Field Communications alliance and buyout ===
On May 26, 1972, Kaiser sold a 22.5 percent minority stake in their broadcasting holdings to Chicago-based Field Communications (excluded from this were KBSC-TV and the radio stations) while Kaiser acquired a 77.5 percent majority stake in WFLD-TV, Field's Chicago station. Completed in May 1973, the Kaiser/Field partnership was named Kaiser Broadcasting Co. (Kaiser Co.) and included KBHK-TV, WFLD-TV, WKBD-TV, WKBS-TV, WKBF-TV and majority control of WKBG-TV. The Boston Globe sold its stake in WKBG-TV to Kaiser in 1974, with the station renamed WLVI. After a prior attempt to spin off KBSC-TV to a prospective subscription television operator failed, Kaiser sold off the station to a joint venture between Oak Industries and Jerry Perenchio in December 1975, becoming the genesis of the ON TV pay television service.

Faced with mounting financial losses in Cleveland, Kaiser ceased all operations at WKBF-TV on April 25, 1975, selling off the majority of assets to United Artists Broadcasting, owner of WUAB. In turn, Kaiser purchased a 36 percent equity stake in WUAB, which it held until United Artists sold off that station in 1977. WKBF-TV management and Kaiser executives conceded that, due to WUAB signing on within months of WKBF-TV, the station never turned a profit and could not find consistent viewership or advertiser support in the Cleveland market.

In January 1977, Kaiser sold its stake in the station group to Field for a combined $42.625 million (equivalent to $226 million in 2025). This sale was part of a larger disposition of Kaiser Industries in which 90 percent of the conglomerate's assets were divested in 1977 alone.

== Programming ==
From 1965 onward, Kaiser Broadcasting consisted of independent outlets that broadcast on the UHF band. In Detroit, Boston and Cleveland, Kaiser-owned stations were the first independents in their respective markets. At a time when viewer interest in watching UHF television was still at its infancy, the Kaiser group programmed aggressively with movies, off-network programs, and children's shows.

While the initial plan of creating a "fourth network" backed by this station group never came to fruition, many of these stations boasted successful local programs, several of which found varying degrees of success through syndication. WKBD-TV's early investment in sports programming enabled them to secure broadcast rights for the NBA's Detroit Pistons, the NHL's Detroit Red Wings and other area college teams. Many of the Kaiser stations purchased syndication rights for Star Trek before other large market stations as counterprogramming against evening news programs on the Big Three networks and, in the case of WKBF-TV, were aired in the same episode order as originally broadcast on NBC.

== Former stations ==
- Stations are arranged in alphabetical order by state and city of license.
- Two boldface asterisks appearing following a station's call letters (**) indicate a station built and signed on by Kaiser.

Stations owned by Kaiser Broadcasting
Media market	State	Station	Purchased	Sold	Notes
Los Angeles	California	KBSC-TV **	1966	1977	(Note: Known as KMTW-TV from 1966 to 1968.)
San Francisco	California	KFOG **	1960	1974	(Note: Known as KBAY-FM from 1960 until 1963.)
San Francisco	California	KBHK-TV **	1968	1977	
Honolulu	Hawaii	KHVH **	1957	1965	
Honolulu	Hawaii	KHVH-TV **	1957	1958	(Note: Frequency currently occupied by KHNL.)
Honolulu	Hawaii	KHVH-TV	1958	1965	
Chicago	Illinois	WFLD-TV	1972	1977	
Boston	Massachusetts	WCAS	1966 (Note: Jointly owned by Kaiser and The Boston Globe from 1966 to 1974.)	1976	
Boston	Massachusetts	WJIB	1966	1972	(Note: Known as WXHR-FM prior to 1967.)
Boston	Massachusetts	WLVI-TV	1966	1977	(Note: Known as WLVI from 1974 onward.)
Detroit	Michigan	WKBD-TV **	1965	1977	
Cleveland	Ohio	WKBF-TV **	1968 (Note: Jointly owned by Kaiser and Superior Broadcasting Company from 1968 to 1972.)	1975	(Note: Ceased operations in 1975; frequency currently occupied by WQHS-TV.)
Philadelphia	Pennsylvania	WKBS-TV **	1965	1977	

== See also ==
- Field Communications
- Fourth television network
