= KPYX =

Television station in San Francisco

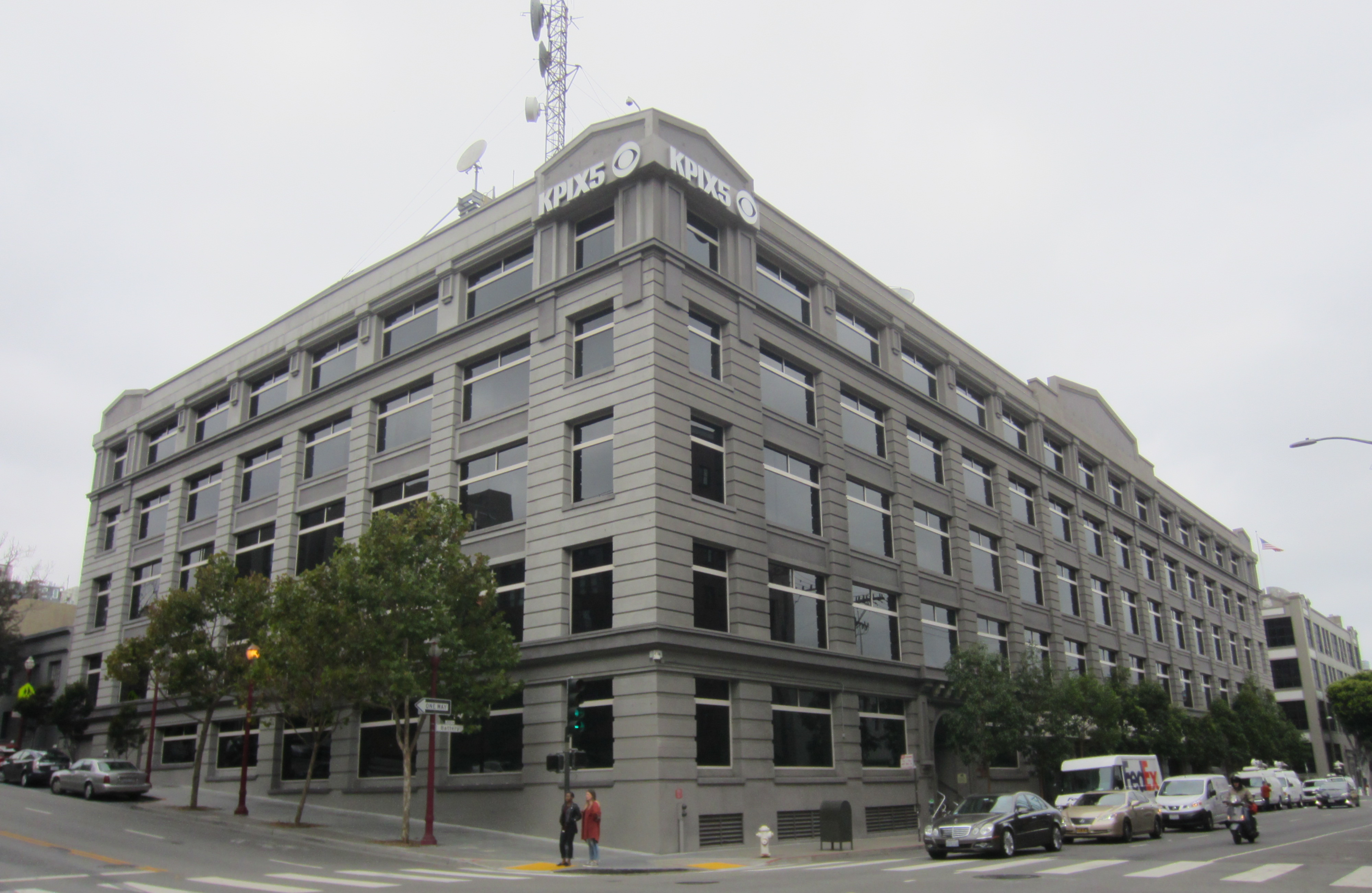
- KPIX/KPYX building at the corner of Battery and Broadway Streets in San Francisco (2018)
- San Francisco–Oakland–; San Jose, California; United States
- City: San Francisco, California
- Channels: Digital: 28 (UHF); Virtual: 44
- Branding: KPIX+

Programming
- Affiliations: 44.1: Independent; for others, see § Subchannels

Ownership
- Owner: CBS Television Stations; (San Francisco Television Station KBCW Inc.)
- Sister stations: KPIX-TV

History
- First air date: January 2, 1968
- Former call signs: KBHK-TV (1967–2006); KBCW (2006–2023)
- Former channel numbers: Analog: 44 (UHF, 1968–2009); Digital: 45 (UHF, 1998–2020)
- Former affiliations: Independent (1968–1995); UPN (1995–2006); The CW (2006–2023)
- Call sign meaning: Brand extension of KPIX

Technical information
- Licensing authority: FCC
- Facility ID: 69619
- ERP: 1,000 kW
- HAAT: 490.3 m (1,609 ft)
- Transmitter coordinates: 37°45′19″N 122°27′10″W

Links
- Public license information: Public file; LMS
- Website: www.cbsnews.com/sanfrancisco/kpixplus/

KPYX (channel 44), branded as KPIX+, is an independent television station licensed to San Francisco, California, United States, serving the San Francisco Bay Area. It is owned by the CBS Television Stations group alongside KPIX-TV (channel 5), the market's CBS owned-and-operated station. The two stations share studios at Broadway and Battery Street, just north of San Francisco's Financial District; KPYX's transmitter is located atop Sutro Tower.

As KBHK, channel 44 was one of the UHF stations built by Kaiser Broadcasting and one of just two commercial UHF stations in the Bay Area to survive a boom-and-bust cycle of new stations in the late 1960s and early 1970s. It was acquired by United Television in 1982 and was one of the launch owned-and-operated stations for the United Paramount Network in 1995. The station has been under its present ownership since 2001 and, as KBCW, was part of The CW from its 2006 launch until 2023, when CBS withdrew its eight affiliates from the network after selling its ownership stake to Nexstar Media Group. Together with a call sign change to KPYX, the station launched prime time and morning local news after leaving The CW.

== History ==
=== Kaiser, Field, and Chris-Craft ownership ===
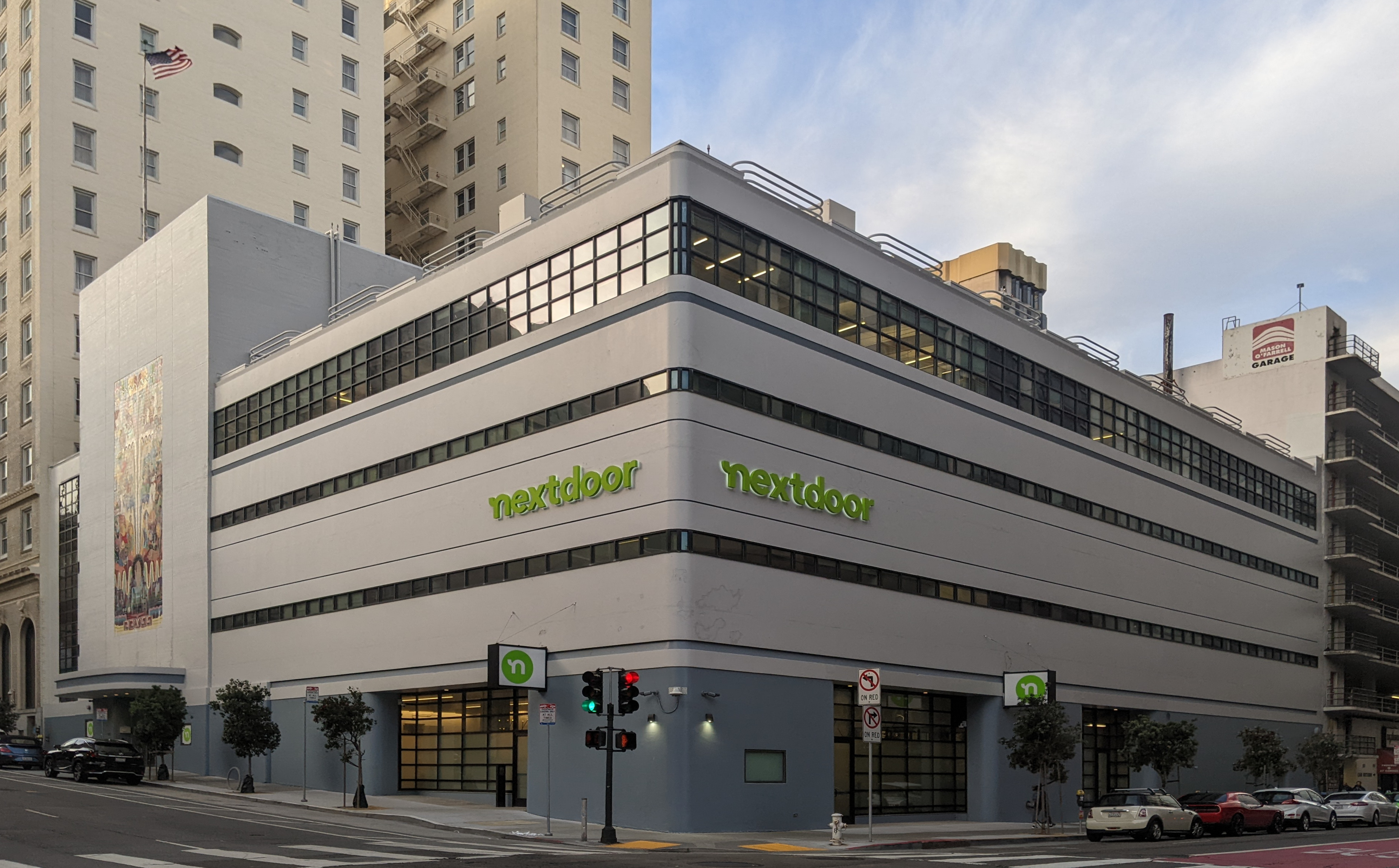
The original studios for channel 44 at 420 Taylor Street, in 2022, now the headquarters for Nextdoor

On November 14, 1962, Kaiser Broadcasting, a division of Oakland-based Kaiser Industries and owner of San Francisco radio station KFOG (104.5 FM), obtained a construction permit to build channel 44 in San Francisco. Before the construction permit bore the call letters KBHK, it was originally KFOG-TV and then KHJK-TV, in honor of Kaiser Industries founder Henry J. Kaiser.

KBHK-TV debuted January 2, 1968. It had been intended that Kaiser sign on two stations at once, with WKBF-TV in Cleveland also planned to launch the same day (weather delays in Cleveland pushed back its launch). Channel 44's flagship local program was Tonight in San Francisco. The studios at 420 Taylor Street had a broadcasting heritage that predated channel 44 by decades; the facility was built for NBC and its San Francisco station, KPO/KNBC/KNBR, and was also used for a time by KGO. KGO moved to new radio and television quarters in the 1950s and KNBR to Fox Plaza in 1967, leaving the facility vacant.

With channel 44, Kaiser became the latest broadcaster to enter what was then a crowded, meager existence on the UHF dial in the Bay Area. By 1968, three other UHF stations operated in San Francisco itself alongside one in San Jose (KGSC) and one educational outlet in San Mateo, the underpowered KCSM-TV. In 1966, Concord's KCFT-TV (channel 42) had existed for all of seven months. With signals that were often hindered by the region's hilly terrain, ratings were low, and all but children and sports fans were hard gets for the stations. KBHK-TV was no exception; three live entertainment programs had failed by 1969, as had a live 10 p.m. newscast, but ratings were increasing. However, as channels 20, 32 and 38 all sank under the weight of financial losses, it was Kaiser's station that remained afloat and operating. Originally broadcasting from San Bruno Mountain, KBHK-TV moved to Sutro Tower upon its completion, with the San Bruno mast used to broadcast KDTV on channel 60 when it started in 1975.

Kaiser Broadcasting merged with Chicago-based Field Communications in 1973 as part of a joint venture between the companies. In 1977, Kaiser sold its interest in the stations to Field for $42.625 million, making Field the sole owner of KBHK. Field also retained the headquarters of its broadcast division in San Francisco. After Field put its stations up for sale in 1982, KBHK was sold to United Television, a division of Chris-Craft Industries, in 1983. United offered $50 million to KQED to switch channel 9 and 44, moving the commercial station to VHF, in 1984; the offer was rejected as too low.

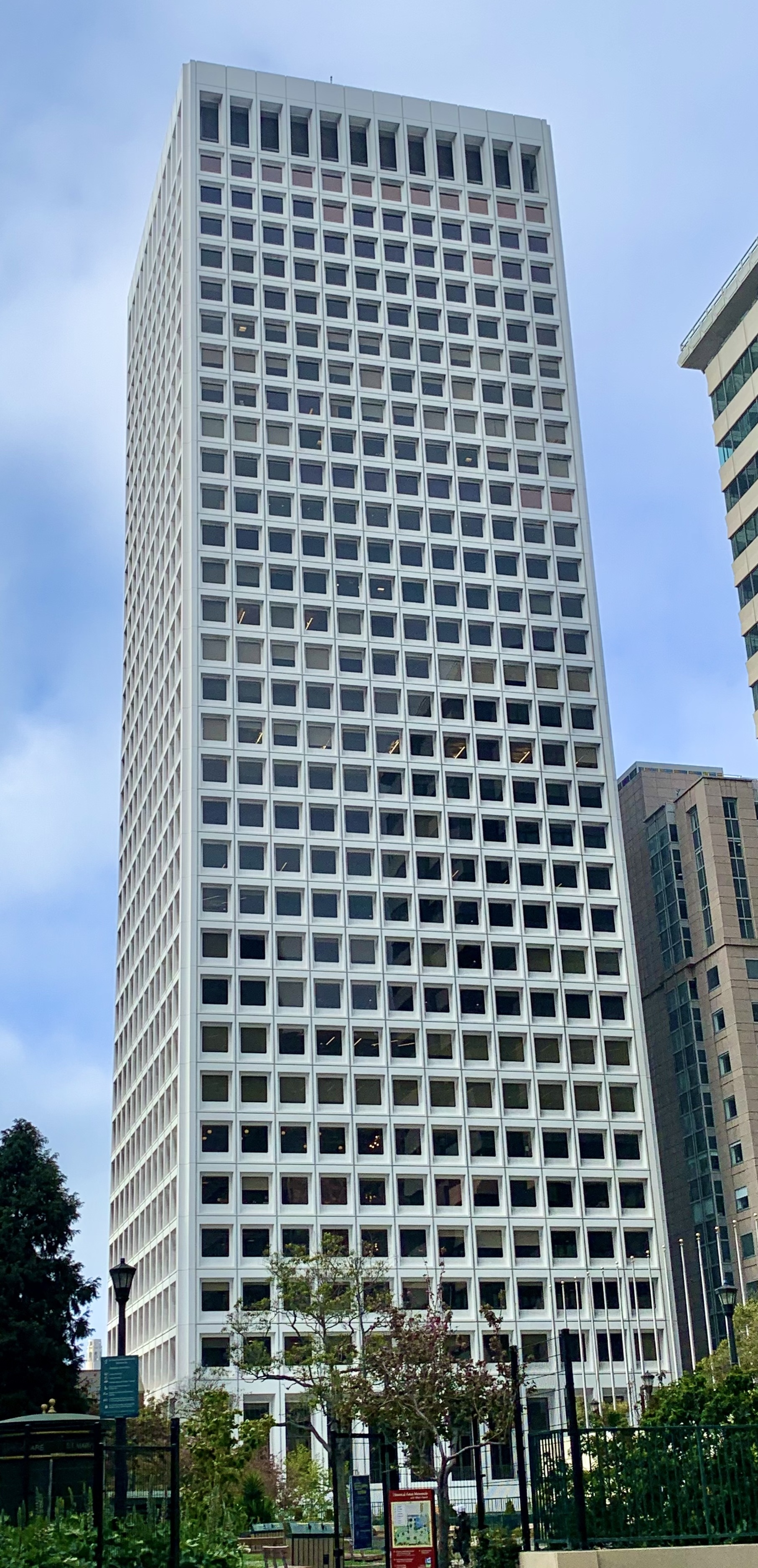
KBHK was located at 650 California Street from 1992 to 2001.

After nearly 25 years at 420 Taylor Street, KBHK moved to 650 California Street in 1992. The station had been looking to move out for some time; in 1988, it had reached a deal with KQED to purchase its former studios when it relocated, but it changed its mind and opted to default on the purchase. The station's traditional focus on prime time movies waned in the early 1990s as channel 44 acquired more first-run syndication, as a new crop of higher-budget shows appeared on the market.

=== As a UPN affiliate ===
In 1993, Chris-Craft/United Television partnered with Paramount Pictures (which would merge with Viacom in 1994) to launch the United Paramount Network (UPN), with the United Television independent stations becoming charter outlets of the network when it launched on January 16, 1995.

In 2000, Viacom bought Chris-Craft's 50% ownership interest in UPN (which Chris-Craft had wholly owned, until Viacom acquired a stake in the network in 1996). On August 12 of that year, Chris-Craft sold its UPN stations to the Fox Television Stations subsidiary of News Corporation for $5.5 billion; the deal was finalized on July 31, 2001. The deal created immediate ownership cap problems for Fox, which sought to have duopolies in markets where it already owned Fox stations; further, Fox could not convert KBHK to the Fox network because KTVU had a long-term affiliation agreement. Similarly, Viacom, which had purchased CBS and KPIX a year earlier, wanted to have duopolies in more markets. As a result, Fox traded KBHK-TV to Viacom in exchange for KTXH in Houston and WDCA in Washington, D.C., which gave Fox duopolies in those markets. The FCC approved the deal in August 2001 on the condition that Viacom sell one of its San Francisco radio stations. After the sale was consummated, KBHK moved from California Street to Grey Rock, the KPIX studios on Battery Street.

=== As a CW affiliate ===
2013–2023 logo as KBCW

On January 24, 2006, the Warner Bros. unit of Time Warner and CBS Corporation (which had been created as a result of the split of Viacom on December 31, 2005) announced that the two companies would shut down The WB and UPN and combine the networks' respective programming to create a new "fifth" network called The CW; the day of the announcement, it was revealed that 11 of CBS Corporation's 15 UPN affiliates, including KBHK, would become CW stations. To reflect the new affiliation, the call letters were changed from KBHK to KBCW on July 1, 2006.

On December 4, 2019, CBS Corporation and Viacom remerged into ViacomCBS (now Paramount Global).

=== Return to independence ===
Nexstar Media Group acquired majority ownership of The CW on October 3, 2022. Under the agreement, CBS was given the right to pull its affiliations from KBCW and its seven other CW stations. CBS announced it would exercise that right on May 5, 2023, disaffiliating KBCW from the network at the end of August and returning the station to independent status, instigating a series of network affiliation changes nationwide. The CW affiliation was moved to KRON-TV, itself owned by Nexstar.

On July 18, 2023, CBS News and Stations filed a request to change KBCW's call letters to KPYX as of September 1, 2023. The new call sign serves as a brand extension of KPIX-TV, with KPYX concurrently rebranded as "KPIX+".

== Local programming ==
=== Sports ===
When channel 44 launched, it was the home of the Golden State Warriors and Oakland Athletics. The A's aired on KBHK from 1968 to 1972 and again from 1982 to 1984, while the Warriors broadcast on channel 44 from 1968 to and again from 1981 to 1984. The station also aired three televised games in the last season of the National Hockey League's California Golden Seals in 1976, preseason games from the NFL's San Francisco 49ers in 1973, and the United States Football League's Oakland Invaders. From 2022 to 2023, the station aired Bay Area Panthers indoor football home games. In 2025, KPIX announced an agreement with the Golden State Valkyries of the WNBA, in its inaugural season, to become the team's first broadcast partner. Games are shared between KPYX and KPIX-TV.

=== Newscasts ===
KBHK briefly produced a nightly newscast in the late 1960s, which was canceled due to low ratings.

On March 3, 2008, KPIX began producing a nightly half-hour prime time newscast at 10 p.m. for KBCW; this program competed against KTVU's longer-established, hour-long newscast. In July 2014, the weeknight newscasts were renamed Bay Area Nightbeat. While the newscast came to an end on December 6, 2019, the station provided an hour of CBSN Bay Area weeknights at 10 until cancelling it in June 2020. In January 2012, KPIX-TV started a short-lived hour-long extension of its weekend morning newscast for KBCW airing on Sundays at 8:30 am, which ended in 2015.

A 10 p.m. newscast was reintroduced in July 2022 as part of the launch of the CBS News Now format. Coinciding with the relaunch as an independent station in 2023, this was replaced with prime time news at 8 and 9 p.m., and the station launched a morning newscast from 7 to 9 a.m.

== Technical information ==
=== Subchannels ===
KPYX's transmitter is located atop Sutro Tower. The station's signal is multiplexed:

Subchannels of KPYX
Subchannel	Res.	Short name	Programming
44.1	1080i	KPYX-DT	Main KPYX programming
44.2	480i	Nest	The Nest
44.3	480i	MeTV	MeTV
44.4	480i	CONFESS	Confess
44.5	480i	QVC 2	QVC2
4.3	480i	Rewind	Rewind TV (KRON-TV)
4.4	480i	Roar	Roar (KRON-TV)

Broadcast on behalf of another station

=== Analog-to-digital conversion ===
KBHK-DT began broadcasting on channel 45 on April 15, 1999. KBCW shut down its analog signal, over UHF channel 44, on June 12, 2009, as part of the federally mandated transition from analog to digital television.

In 2019, KBCW relocated to digital channel 28 as part of the FCC's spectrum reallocation.
