= Lou Gordon (journalist) =

American journalist and talk show host (1917–1977)

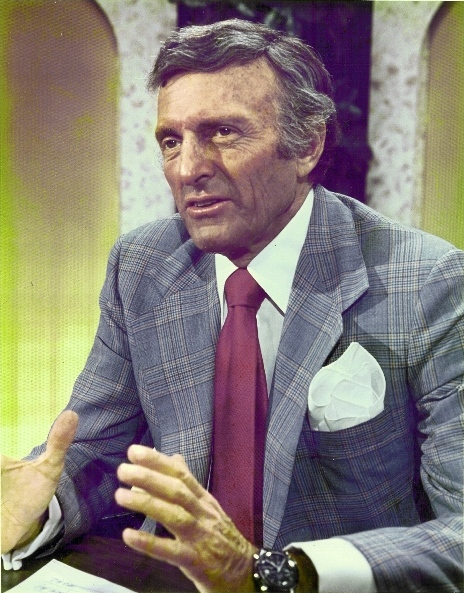
- Lou Gordon
- Born: May 17, 1917; Detroit, Michigan, U.S.
- Died: May 24, 1977 (aged 60); Bloomfield Hills, Michigan, U.S.
- Spouse: Jacqueline "Jackie" Gordon
- Children: A. Scott Gordon, Ruth Gordon Howard, Jon L. Gordon, Deborah L. Gordon, Carol Braitman
- Presenting career
- Show: The Lou Gordon Program
- Station: WKBD-TV Detroit
- Network: Syndicated through Kaiser Broadcasting
- Country: United States

Lou Gordon (May 17, 1917 – May 24, 1977) was a television commentator and talk show host, newspaper columnist, radio host, and influential political reporter, based in Detroit, Michigan. Gordon was known as a flamboyant, irreverent, and controversial interviewer. He hosted The Lou Gordon Program, a twice-weekly, 90-minute television show, that was seen Saturday and Sunday nights on WKBD-TV. Produced from 1966 to 1977, The Lou Gordon Program was also syndicated across most of the larger media markets in the United States to the Kaiser Broadcasting group of stations, as well as several non-Kaiser stations. Three 90-minute television shows were taped per week - two for telecast only on WKBD, the other for nationwide broadcast.

The show's theme song was MacArthur Park, composed by Jimmy Webb and performed by Richard Harris; the portion of the song used for the show's theme was the long, jazzy climactic orchestral break approximately 3/4 way through the recording.

The show was co-hosted by Lou's wife, Jackie Gordon (1932-1999), who would read questions sent by viewers to Lou. Lou would then give his opinions on the viewer's question.

In addition to his television program, Gordon wrote a twice-weekly column for The Detroit News, which usually reflected, or elaborated on, topics recently featured on his television program.

During the 1967–68 Detroit newspaper strike, Gordon published Scope Magazine in order to fill the news-hole made by a lack of daily newspapers in Detroit. Lou Gordon was the president of Scope Publishing, as well as a writer, and published the weekly until the Detroit newspaper strike ended. Scope Magazine also featured his wife, Jackie, as advice columnist.

== Interviewees ==
Among the people interviewed by Gordon was three-term Michigan Governor George W. Romney, whom he interviewed on August 31, 1967. Boston Globe reporter Neil Swidey said that "for more than a year, Romney had been talked about as the Republicans' best chance for winning the White House in 1968. So, during that August interview, when [Romney] was asked by Lou to explain his inconsistent position on the [Vietnam] war, Romney replied, 'Well you know Lou, when I came back from Vietnam, I had just had the greatest brainwashing that anybody can get.' One word, brainwashing, [emphasis added] and his presidential campaign would never recover. Worse, that single, politically-charged word became not just the shorthand for his aborted White House run, but also the bumper sticker for his entire life's work." The controversial interview with Romney landed Gordon and his Lou Gordon Program on the front page of newspapers across the country, as well as Time magazine.

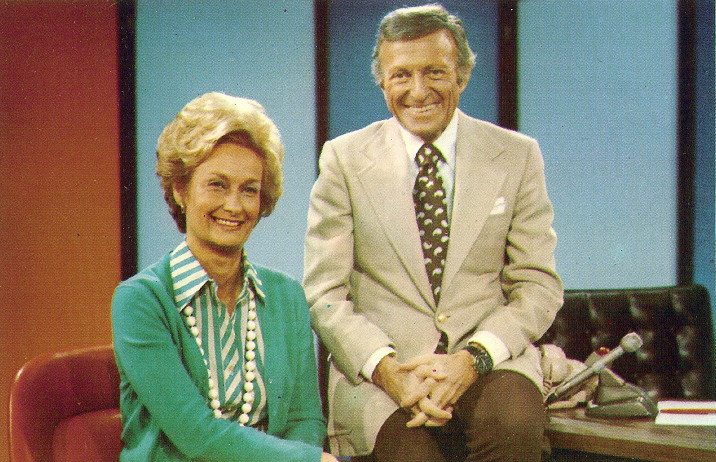
Lou and Jackie Gordon

In an ironic footnote to all the publicity and political fallout surrounding the Romney interview, the staff at WKBD did not initially realize the scoop they had on their hands. The station was still in its infancy (first air date only two and a half years earlier in January 1965) and was always looking for cost efficiencies. One of those cost-cutting directives was to routinely wipe and re-use videotape. With no hint of the firestorm that was about to come, the Gordon show reel was simply put on the shelf of available videotape and quickly re-recorded with another local show. In the days that followed the national attention from the Romney interview, the station officials mounted an all-hands search for the segment, but it remained missing until it surfaced in recent years and is now available for educational and personal use.

Many guests got so frustrated with Gordon's hard-hitting style that they simply walked off the show in the middle of the interview. In one controversial episode, which originated from WKBS-TV in Philadelphia, mayor Frank Rizzo walked out of an interview with Lou because Rizzo thought the questions were unfair.

Gordon was one of the first journalists to come out publicly against the Vietnam War (in 1964, prior to the 1965 Marines invasion) and was also one of the first commentators to publicly accuse President Richard Nixon of wrongdoing in the Watergate scandal. Gordon considered being on Nixon's Enemies List as a "Badge of Honor".

In early 1977, shortly before his death, Gordon interviewed Chuck Colson, who was on tour in support of his new book, Born Again. As suggested by the title of his book, Colson was "born again" as a recently converted Christian. During the interview, Gordon asked Colson, "Do you suppose, Mr. Colson, that God caused your father to die while you were in prison as a punishment for your lifetime of sins?" Colson wrote later that as the two stared at each other, "absolute contempt passed between us," but Colson answered, "I don't believe that about my dad, Lou. Ours is a loving God."

== Gordon's mission ==
Gordon expressed his strong opinions while exposing elements of phoniness. His show featured controversial "gotcha" moments (uncommon at the time) which exposed guests when they gave statements that Gordon knew, through research, were not true. In addition to the research from his staff, Gordon read seven newspapers per day and two books per week. Several of the papers were unavailable locally, so were flown into Detroit via commercial airliner and delivered to Gordon's office via taxi cab on a daily basis.

Gordon was once asked by an interviewer if he were the last angry man. He responded that many citizens were angry with irresponsible government and corruption but that citizens didn't have a voice to speak-up. He said that "fate and circumstance have cast me in the role of the peoples advocate and the voice of dissent, and I like the role... I love it."

According to author Tim Kiska, "He was Detroit's Mike Wallace, a broadcast cop who cowered before no one. The bigger the interview, the tougher he got. Most interviewers bowed and scraped before Bob Hope, but Gordon asked him about his defense of President Nixon during the Vietnam era. Gordon questioned George Wallace's sanity – to his face. Gordon was, by far, the most feared man in television, maybe in the history of the local medium."

== Death and aftermath ==
Lou Gordon died May 24, 1977, of heart failure, stemming from a valve replacement in the mid-1970s due to rheumatic fever. On June 26, 1977, WKBD aired The Lou Gordon Tribute: Man of Conscience, Man of Truth, a clip show of the best moments of the program, hosted by NBC's Tom Snyder. The 90 minute program featured many good wishes and interviews from people like Senator Carl Levin to the preternatural "Joey the Hitman". According to Snyder, Gordon devoted his life to "standing up for the voiceless, representing the little man and being the people's advocate."

Following Gordon's death, WKBD attempted to find a worthy successor—in November 1977, the station launched a new weekly program hosted by conservative radio talk show host Barry Farber, but it was only short-lived. WKBD later attempted a televised pilot with Detroit News journalist Mike Wendland (August 1978) and a short-lived series hosted by Boston attorney Joe Oteri (1978–1979), before giving up on the concept altogether.

After Lou's death, Jackie Gordon acted in television commercials, and performed voice-over work for various advertising campaigns. She also held the position of Consumer Advocate for Great Scott Supermarkets. Jackie was also head of Public Relations for the Jacobson's department store chain, and Public Relations Director for the Detroit Institute of Technology. Upon her retirement, she rejoined WKBD on a part-time basis, giving tours of the television station to visitors and groups. Jackie was also a major force in charity work throughout the metropolitan Detroit area, and continued her role as celebrity personality until her death on August 2, 1999.
