= Field Communications =

Television station group based in Chicago, Illinois

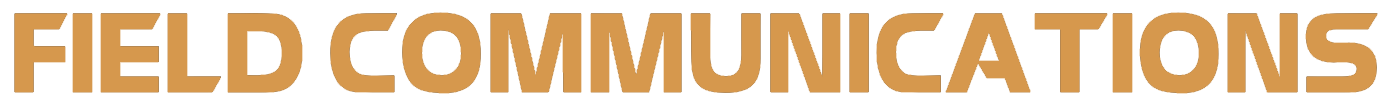
- Type: Subsidiary
- Industry: Broadcast television
- Founded: January 4, 1966; 60 years ago
- Defunct: August 30, 1983; 43 years ago
- Fate: Dissolved, last station being shut down by Field.
- Headquarters: Chicago, Illinois
- Area served: United States
- Key people: Marshall Field V, co-CEO; Frederick W. (Ted) Field, co-CEO
- Products: Broadcast television
- Parent: Field Enterprises

Field Communications was an American broadcast media company and a wholly owned division of Field Enterprises, which owned the Chicago Sun-Times and the Chicago Daily News. Based in Chicago, Illinois, the company had owned UHF independent television stations in the United States, with WFLD-TV in Chicago as its flagship and largest-market station.

== History ==
The broadcasting arm of Field Enterprises began in January 1966 with the initial sign-on of WFLD.

On May 26, 1972, Field sold a majority ownership (about 77.5 percent) of WFLD-TV to Oakland, California–based Kaiser Broadcasting; in turn, Kaiser sold a 22.5 percent minority stake in their station group to Field. The Kaiser chain consisted of WKBD-TV in Detroit, WKBF-TV in Cleveland, WKBS-TV in the Philadelphia area, KBHK-TV in San Francisco, WKBG-TV in Boston (owned by Kaiser in a joint venture with the Boston Globe) and KBSC-TV in the Los Angeles area. KBSC-TV, which had struggled in the Los Angeles area since it took to the air in 1966, was put up for sale, but a deal could not be finalized until 1975. The Kaiser/Field partnership was named Kaiser Broadcasting Co. (Kaiser Co.) when the deal was completed in May 1973.

The Boston Globe sold its minority ownership stake in WKBG-TV back to Kaiser/Field in 1974, with the station renamed WLVI. WKBF-TV was shut down permanently on April 25, 1975, after years of mounting financial losses, with Kaiser/Field selling the station's non-license assets to WUAB parent United Artists Broadcasting. In turn, Kaiser/Field purchased a 36 percent equity stake in WUAB, which it held until United Artists sold off that station to Gaylord Broadcasting in 1977.

In January 1977, Field purchased Kaiser's majority control in the entire broadcast group for a combined $42.625 million (equivalent to $226 million in 2025), while also resulted in an outright repurchase of WFLD-TV. This transaction was instigated by a larger disposition of Kaiser Industries throughout 1977 in which 90 percent of the conglomerate's assets were divested.

=== Beginning of the end ===
In 1982, half-brothers Marshall Field V and Frederick W. (Ted) Field, who each controlled half of Field Enterprises, were at odds on how the company should operate which left them unable to work together. As a result of the dispute, Field opted to dissolve the company and the broadcast holdings were put up for sale as a group; when no prospective buyers emerged, the stations were individually put up for sale.

By the end of 1982, Field had deals in place for three of the stations: WFLD-TV to Metromedia, WLVI-TV to Gannett, and KBHK-TV to Chris-Craft Industries/United Television. The search for buyers for the Detroit and Philadelphia outlets would continue well into 1983. While WKBD-TV was sold to Cox Enterprises in May 1983, finding an entity to purchase WKBS-TV proved to be difficult. Faced with a deadline to complete the liquidation of Field Enterprises, and with no purchasers having been found, Field took WKBS-TV dark on August 30, 1983, and returned the station's license to the FCC, while selling off existing programming rights and station equipment to its main competitor, WPHL-TV.

== Former stations ==
City of license / Market	Station	Sold to	Current status
San Francisco–Oakland–San Jose, CA	KBHK-TV 44	Chris-Craft/United Television	Independent KPYX, owned by Skydance
Chicago, IL	WFLD-TV 32	Metromedia	Fox owned-and-operated (O&O)
Cambridge–Boston, MA	WLVI-TV 56	Gannett	The CW affiliate owned by Sunbeam Television
Detroit, MI	WKBD-TV 50	Cox Broadcasting	The CW affiliate owned by Skydance
Burlington, NJ–Philadelphia, PA	WKBS-TV 48	None, taken off the air	Defunct, license deleted
