= Hy Lit =

American DJ (1934–2007)

- Born: May 20, 1934; Philadelphia, Pennsylvania, U.S.
- Died: November 17, 2007 (aged 73)
- Resting place: West Laurel Hill Cemetery, Bala Cynwyd, Pennsylvania, U.S.
- Education: University of Miami
- Occupation: Disc jockey

Hyman Aaron "Hy" Lit (May 20, 1934 – November 17, 2007) was an American disc jockey and television personality. He broadcast on several radio channels in the Philadelphia area including WHAT (AM), WRCV (now KYW), WIBG, WCAM, WDAS-FM, WPGR, WSNI and WOGL from 1954 to 2005. He hosted popular record hops throughout Philadelphia and emceed performances of Rock and roll musicians including The Beach Boys, The Beatles, Elvis Presley, and The Rolling Stones. He hosted two television dance shows - Block Party on WCAU and 48 A-GoGo on WKBS-TV; and the nationally syndicated Hy Lit Show on WKBS-TV. He was inducted into the Philadelphia Music Alliance Walk of Fame in 1993 and the Broadcast Pioneers of Philadelphia Hall of Fame in 2003.

== Early life and education ==
Lit was born May 20, 1934, to Sam and Mona (Kessler) Lit, in South Philadelphia. He studied dramatics at the University of Miami.

== Career ==
Lit began his radio career in 1954 at WHAT (AM), a Rhythm and blues radio station intended for black audiences where he was the only white DJ. He developed a large teenage audience by playing the music they wanted to hear. He moved to WRCV (now KYW) for a year and then to WIBG where his show drew a 71 market share, a record unmatched by any local radio program since.

He was known for his "hip" language with expressions such as "For all my carrot tops, lollipops, and delicate gum drops, it's Hyski 'O Rooney McVouti 'O Zoot!" He was influenced by Lord Buckley and incorporated similar phrases into his broadcasts such as "Hipsters, flipsters, and finger popping daddies, knock me your lobes" and "jump salty". He published his lexicon in a book, Hy Lit's Unbelievable Dictionary of Hip Words for Groovy People in 1968.

He hosted record hops in Philadelphia that drew in huge crowds. In 1957, he hosted Block Party, a dance show on WCAU Channel 10 in Philadelphia. In 1965, he hosted 48 A-GoGo, another dance show on WKBS-TV. He hosted the nationally syndicated Hy Lit Show on WKBS-TV. He emceed performances of major rock and roll stars including The Beach Boys, The Beatles, Elvis Presley, and The Rolling Stones.

Lit left WIBG due to a payola scandal in which he was accused of accepting bribes to play certain records. He worked at WCAM, and in 1968 joined WDAS to host Hy Ski's Underground, a new progressive format show that incorporated long music sets of deep album cuts and rhythm and blues. He also broadcast at WPGR and WSNI.

In 1993, he was inducted into the Philadelphia Music Alliance Walk of Fame. He received the first March of Dimes Lifetime Achievement of Radio Award in 1994 and Radio & Records magazine's Oldies Personality of the Year in 1999.

In the early 2000's, he pioneered internet broadcasting with the website HyLitRadio.com.

He worked at WOGL (FM) for several years and had high ratings with their oldies format. His hours were reduced by WOGL and he sued them for age discrimination. The lawsuit was settled in December 2005 and he retired at that time.

He was inducted into the Broadcast Pioneers of Philadelphia Hall of Fame in 2003.

Lit died November 17, 2007, at Paoli Memorial Hospital of heart and kidney failure. He was interred at West Laurel Hill Cemetery in Bala Cynwyd, Pennsylvania.

== Personal life ==
He married Miriam "Mim" Uniman, a former Miss Universe contestant who was Miss Philadelphia in 1956. Together they had two children and were divorced in the 1970s. He was re-married and his second wife died in 2000.

He suffered from Parkinson's Disease and became a spokesperson for others that were impacted by the disease.
