= WLVI =

Television station in Cambridge, Massachusetts

- Cambridge–Boston, Massachusetts; United States
- City: Cambridge, Massachusetts
- Channels: Digital: 35 (UHF), shared with WHDH; Virtual: 56
- Branding: CW 56

Programming
- Affiliations: 56.1: The CW; 56.2: Buzzr

Ownership
- Owner: Sunbeam Television; (WHDH-TV)
- Sister stations: WHDH

History
- First air date: September 27, 1953
- Former call signs: WTAO-TV (1953–1956); WXHR-TV (1965–1966); WKBG-TV (1966–1974)
- Former channel numbers: Analog: 56 (UHF, 1953–2009); Digital: 41 (UHF, 2003–2018), 42 (UHF, 2018–2019)
- Former affiliations: DuMont/ABC (1953–1956); Independent (1966–1995); The WB (1995–2006); NBC (alternate, 2006–2016)
- Call sign meaning: "LVI" is 56 in Roman numerals

Technical information
- Licensing authority: FCC
- Facility ID: 73238
- ERP: 1,000 kW
- HAAT: 304.1 m (998 ft)
- Transmitter coordinates: 42°18′41″N 71°12′58″W

Links
- Public license information: Public file; LMS
- Website: whdh.com/cw56/

WLVI (channel 56) is a television station licensed to Cambridge, Massachusetts, United States, serving the Boston area as an affiliate of The CW. It is owned by Sunbeam Television alongside WHDH (channel 7), an independent station. WLVI and WHDH share studios at Bulfinch Place (near Government Center) in downtown Boston; through a channel sharing agreement, the two stations transmit using WHDH's spectrum from the WHDH-TV tower in Newton, Massachusetts.

Channel 56 is Boston's oldest UHF station, with roots dating to 1953 and having been in continuous operation since 1966. In addition to syndicated entertainment programs, the station was notable for producing a variety of local children's and sports programs, and in the late 1960s and between 1984 and 2006, it produced local newscasts.

== History ==
=== WTAO-TV ===
On December 19, 1952, the Middlesex Broadcasting Company, owners of WTAO (740 AM) and WXHR (96.9 FM), applied for a construction permit to build a new television station in Cambridge, using Boston's allocated channel 56, which would originate from studios and transmitter atop Zion Hill in Woburn. The Federal Communications Commission (FCC) granted the permit on March 11, 1953. After having broadcast a test pattern since August 31, WTAO-TV debuted on September 27, 1953, as Boston's third television outlet and first on the UHF band.

Our situation differs from the case of those who have gone dark before us only in the fact that we should have properly taken this step months ago.

— Station president Frank Lyman, Jr.

An affiliate of the DuMont Television Network with occasional ABC programs, the station suffered from its position on the UHF band—as, in the days before the All-Channel Receiver Act, not all TV sets could receive UHF stations. After DuMont eliminated entertainment programming in 1955 and with most ABC output airing on WNAC-TV (channel 7), the small station became reliant on movies and limited local programming to fill its airtime. On March 30, 1956, the station quit telecasting: its last program was a ceremony marking its departure from the air, with Massachusetts lieutenant governor Sumner G. Whittier delivering an address. It was the 58th UHF to fold, with president Frank Lyman, Jr., blaming the intermixture of VHF and UHF stations in the market.

Despite its closure, WTAO-TV retained its construction permit. Harvey Radio Laboratories acquired the radio and television stations in 1959, and in 1962, Harvey loaned the station to the Archdiocese of Boston. The channel broadcast a demonstration program that November 10 of what viewers, particularly clergy, could expect from the Catholic TV Center. The archdiocese later built WIHS-TV (channel 38), which began telecasting in 1964. On April 12, 1965, WTAO-TV changed its call letters to WXHR-TV.

=== The Kaiser and Field years ===
In June 1966, Harvey Radio Laboratories sold its entire Boston-area broadcasting operation to Kaiser Broadcasting. Kaiser then sold 50 percent to The Boston Globe.

Kaiser ordered $3 million in new RCA equipment to outfit a new channel 56 on an old construction permit. The new station also made a major push into sports, with away games of the Boston Celtics and Boston Bruins. The Kaiser-Globe partnership began operating the radio stations in November 1966, and under new WKBG-TV call letters, channel 56 returned to the air on December 21, 1966—two days after the opening ceremonies, because the station was hit with last-minute technical delays due to bad weather.

Little except the transmitter site was retained from the prior WTAO-TV. The effective radiated power at launch was 282,000 watts, up from 20,000, and a second boost came months after launch. After briefly operating from temporary quarters at 1050 Commonwealth Avenue in Brookline, the Kaiser-Globe partnership purchased a former supermarket next to the newspaper in Dorchester in 1968 and built a $2.25 million studio facility on the property, which was completed in 1969. This came alongside a move of the transmitter from Woburn to Needham on a tower shared with WSBK-TV (the former WIHS-TV), further expanding the station's signal and filling in gaps to the south and west. Despite all of this investment, WKBG-TV had lost nearly $11 million from its launch to November 1970.

By 1969, WSBK-TV had secured both the Bruins and Celtics; when it had to choose one or the other, WKBG had opted for the Celtics, only for the Bruins to become resurgent on channel 38 and the Celtics to falter. It also aired telecasts of the World Hockey Association's New England Whalers from 1972 to 1974.

After having cut from 50 to 10 percent ownership in 1968, in 1974, the Globe sold its share in WKBG back to Kaiser in exchange for a $500,000 note and $270,000 in advertising credit for the station; the newspaper recorded a $289,000 loss on its broadcasting investment. The call letters were then changed to the current WLVI-TV (reflecting the Roman numeral for 56, LVI) on May 1, in part because WKBG was being confused with other local stations in ratings diaries.

Kaiser Broadcasting merged with Chicago-based Field Communications in 1973 as part of a joint venture between the companies. In 1977, Kaiser sold its interest in the stations to Field for $42.625 million, making Field the sole owner of WLVI. In the late 1970s, Lucie Salhany—later the chair of Fox and one of the creators of UPN—worked as the station's program director.

=== Gannett ownership ===
In case you forgot where I'm from, I was raised on Peking ravioli, 99 Restaurant, channel 56 and the Coffee Coolatta.

— Mindy Kaling, a native of Cambridge

In 1983, WLVI was sold to the Gannett Company—primarily an owner of network-affiliated stations—as part of a liquidation of Field's television assets. The $47 million winning bid beat out a $44 million offer from a group of investors that included channel 56's general manager. To purchase WLVI, Gannett had to divest itself of one of its two UHF stations; it ended up selling both WPTA in Fort Wayne, Indiana, and WLKY-TV in Louisville, Kentucky, to Pulitzer Publishing. Under Gannett, WLVI continued its general entertainment format. This included a running tradition of children's programming. In the 1970s and 1980s, "Uncle Dale" Dorman (also a popular Boston radio personality) hosted the cartoons via off-screen announcements. A WLVI Kids Club was established in January 1990; by that July, it had 65,000 members across New England and as far as Long Island.

From 1985 to 1990, WLVI again became the carrier of the Boston Celtics road games after it made a five-year, $12.5 million deal with the team. Although it was one of the strongest independent stations in the country, it passed on the Fox affiliation when that network launched in 1986; Fox then purchased WXNE, which became WFXT. After a limited partnership including the Celtics acquired that station in 1989, the team's games moved to channel 25 in 1990. By 1993, with competition from WFXT and WSBK for news in the planning stages and no marquee sports programming, the station was seen as lacking an identity.

=== WB affiliation and Tribune Company ownership ===
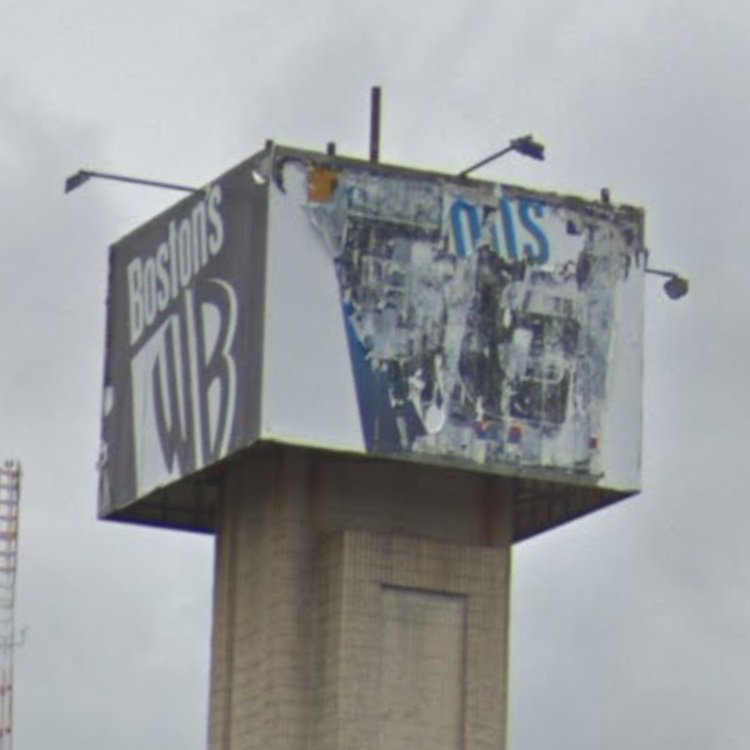
The "Boston's WB" logo remains visible, though beaten by the elements, on a pylon at the former Morrissey Boulevard studios of WLVI in this 2019 photo, along with a Kaiser-era "56" logo on one side of the pylon

In November 1993, Gannett sold the station to the Tribune Company's broadcasting division, which was finalized in early 1994. The day before the sale had been announced, Tribune had revealed the creation of The WB Television Network, of which WLVI was announced as an affiliate; the network launched January 11, 1995. The station also served as the default WB affiliate for Providence, Rhode Island—where WLVI had been available on cable for decades—until WLWC signed on in 1997, remaining on Providence's cable system as late as 2003. WLVI's newscasts continued to air on Rhode Island cable as late as 2012.

The station briefly went off the air in August 1998, when a crane that was erecting a nearby studio-to-transmitter link (STL) tower collapsed onto WLVI's studio building. Though no one was injured and the damage was confined to the station's office spaces, the incident resulted in several hundred thousand dollars' worth of damage. The station used a satellite truck for a network programming downlink and studio space at WCVB-TV (channel 5)'s facilities in Needham for its 10 p.m. newscast.

In the late 1990s, WLVI twice attempted to court rights to be the flagship station of the Boston Red Sox. A proposal was put together and initially agreed with Kevin Dunn, who headed a $67 million bid, but investors pulled out, and the Red Sox ended up spending three seasons on WABU (channel 68). Three years later, Kevin Dunn was successful in obtaining the rights through a company known as JCS on a two-year contract. However, the JCS partnership ended in financial failure, and WFXT displaced JCS and WLVI after just one year when JCS could not come up with the full 1999 rights payment. In the 2000s through 2006, WLVI broadcast New England Revolution soccer games.

=== CW affiliation and Sunbeam purchase ===
WLVI logo used from December 18, 2006, until 2013

On January 24, 2006, CBS Corporation and Time Warner's Warner Bros. Entertainment (the division that operated The WB) announced that they would dissolve UPN and The WB, and combine their most popular programs alongside new series on a newly created network, The CW, which launched September 18, 2006. The network signed 10-year affiliation agreements with 16 of Tribune's 19 WB affiliates, including WLVI, even though CBS owned WSBK.

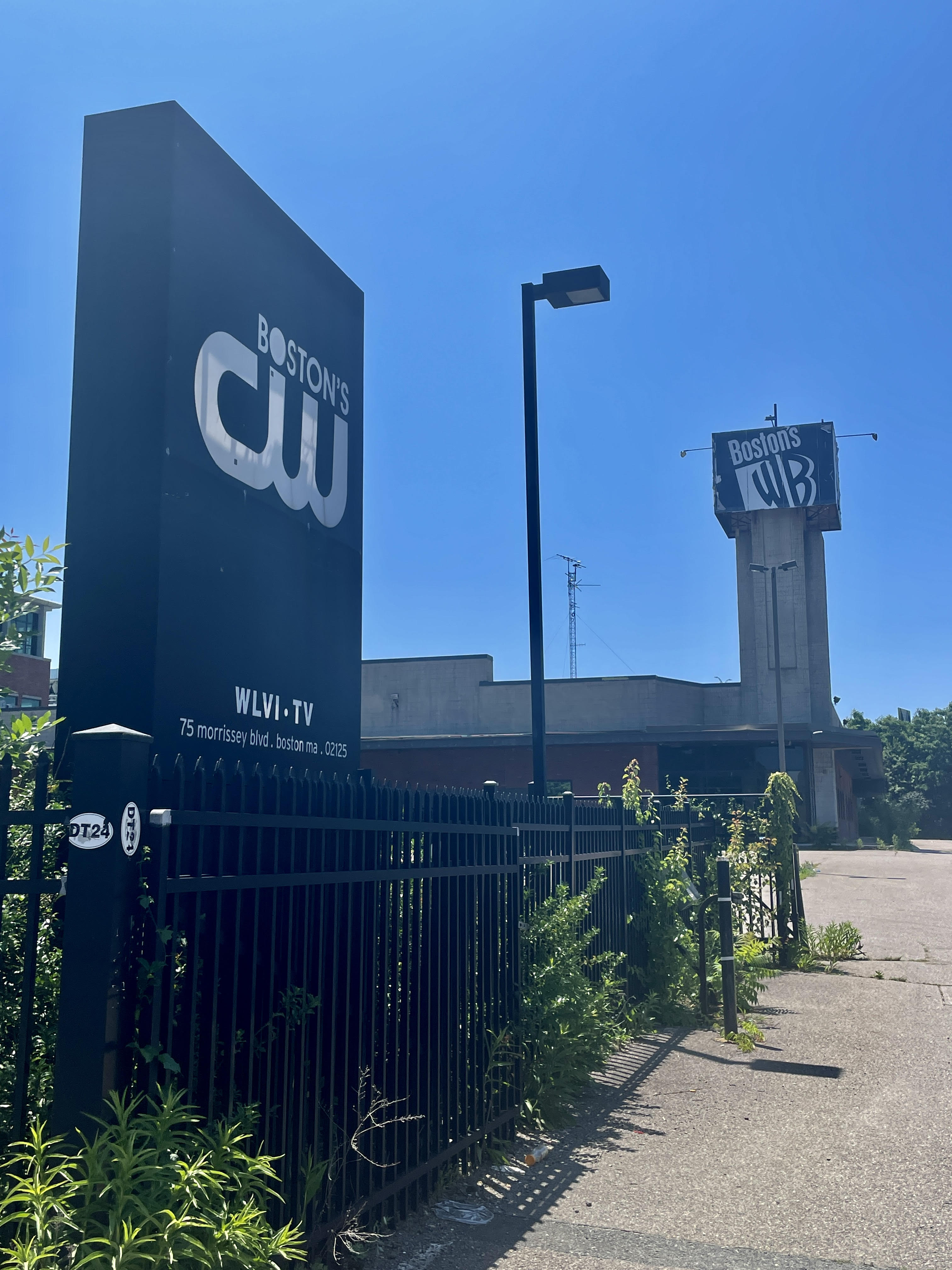
The Morrissey Blvd. studio site showing both the WB and CW branding (2023)

As this was going on, however, Tribune was attempting to improve its balance sheet as part of a "performance improvement plan" that called for $500 million in asset sales. On September 14, 2006, four days prior to the launch of The CW, Tribune Broadcasting announced that WLVI would be sold to Sunbeam Television, owner of then-NBC affiliate WHDH-TV, for $117.3 million. The sale was announced to employees the day some received new "Boston's CW" business cards. The sale received FCC approval in late November 2006, creating the Boston market's third television duopoly (after CBS-owned WBZ-TV and WSBK, and Hearst-owned WCVB-TV and Manchester, New Hampshire-based WMUR-TV). Tribune continued to operate WLVI until December 18, 2006, when the final Tribune-produced newscast aired.

The sale to Sunbeam took effect the following day. In buying WLVI, it acquired the license, transmitter facility, and programming rights. Except for a few technicians, the station's staff was laid off; the operations that remained were consolidated with WHDH. The Morrissey Boulevard building has remained vacant since the acquisition; in 2007, a lease on the site was described as a "tough sell". The site was later purchased by car dealer Herb Chambers (who proposed a new car dealership on the site); in 2020 and 2021, plans were proposed for redevelopment of the site and, in future phases, adjacent parcels. As of 2022, a decaying "Boston's CW" sign graces the entrance to the property, while a dilapidated "Boston's WB" sign remains visible atop the pylon on the studio building, a site the Dorchester Reporter community newspaper described as "verging on eyesore status".

== News operation ==
=== Early attempts ===
At WTAO-TV's inception, the station aired two fifteen-minute evening newscasts, at 6 and 10:30 p.m., branded as United Press News and anchored by Bob Merhmann. These newscasts were canceled within two years.

On December 1, 1969, WKBG-TV debuted a half-hour 10 p.m. newscast, called Ten PM News, the first prime time newscast on a commercial television station in the market. The newscast was anchored by Boston news veteran Arch MacDonald, who was lured away from WBZ-TV, where he had been a news anchor for two decades. It is also notable for being the first on-screen job for Natalie Jacobson, who went on to become lead anchor at WCVB-TV in the 1970s. Despite a loyal audience and ratings that were competitive with the network affiliates, WKBG lost a considerable amount of money on the newscast and shut the news department down in November 1970. MacDonald remained at the station for another year to host a weekday morning interview program; he took a position with the then-new WCVB in 1972.

=== Return to late news (1984–2006) ===
Field Communications started a news department shortly before putting WLVI up for sale. In 1982, it began producing a 10 p.m. weeknight newscast, which initially was a pair of ten-minute locally produced inserts in what otherwise was an hour-long simulcast of CNN Headline News. Rumors of expansion were immediate upon the Gannett expansion; WLVI expanded it into a half-hour broadcast on April 23, 1984, originally on weeknights only. Debuting as The News at Ten, it established itself with top-drawer talent early on with Boston news veteran Jack Hynes as lead anchor and Bill O'Connell handling sports.

During its first three years on the air, The News at Ten was accompanied at 10:30 p.m. by the continuation of cable news service simulcasts. CNN Headline News aired in the timeslot following the local half-hour news, as it did prior to the latter's debut. In January 1986, Headline News was replaced in favor of the nationally syndicated Independent Network News, which was produced by WPIX in New York City. When WLVI's one-year contract with INN expired, the station expanded the weeknight broadcast of The News at Ten to one hour on January 26, 1987; that week, it also began broadcasting hourlong weekend newscasts.

For well over a decade, WLVI was the ratings leader in the 10 p.m. timeslot, with or without news competition in the arena. The only other Boston station producing a newscast in that time period was WGBH-TV; that effort ended in 1991. On February 1, 1993, WLVI rebranded its newscasts as The Ten O'Clock News—a less confusing title that had been used by WGBH. That fall, however, legitimate competition sprang up for The Ten O'Clock News. Fox affiliate WFXT (channel 25) debuted the New England Cable News-produced Fox 25 News at Ten on September 7, 1993, while WSBK-TV introduced the WBZ-produced WBZ News 4 on TV 38 on October 25. The latter stations aggressively marketed their fledgling newscasts, and a three-way race ensued with the stations running close in the ratings.

At the same time, Jack Hynes relegated himself to weekend anchor and commentator/substitute anchor on weekdays, paving the way for future lead anchors Jon Du Pre (1993–95, later of Fox News Channel), and Jeff Barnd (1995–2002). While Barnd developed a strong following with viewers, he also became known for his joking in-between stories and tendencies to ad-lib. One such occurrence of this behavior in September 2001, just days after the September 11 attacks, shocked local media outlets, in which Barnd jumped from his anchor chair and started dancing around the set after presenting the top story. Barnd was subsequently disciplined by station management after the incident. In 2002, the station parted ways with Barnd, seeking a return to a more serious newscast.

Another mainstay of WLVI's newscasts was chief meteorologist Mike Wankum, who first joined the station in 1993. Boston Globe columnist Jon Keller, who joined the same year, was also a fixture for over a decade as the station's political analyst. In 2005, Keller departed WLVI to become the new chief political reporter and analyst for WBZ-TV.

The only time WLVI programmed news outside its established late evening time slot was in June 2000, when it premiered Boston's WB in the Morning. Formatted as a mix of news, talk and lifestyle features, the show aired from 6 to 8 a.m. The program lasted two years; despite expanding to three hours during its run, it could not hold its own against the other local and national morning news programs, and it was canceled in April 2002, taking with it 17 jobs.

By 2002, when Boston's WB in the Morning ended, WLVI's 10 p.m. newscast had slipped to second in the ratings behind WFXT, which had established its own local news service in 1996. After Barnd left, Frank Mallicoat, who had joined the station in 1991 as a weekend sports anchor and would go on to host the morning show before replacing Jack Hynes as weekend anchor, was tapped to replace him on the program. However, WFXT had firmly established itself as the 10 p.m. news leader in Boston. By the time of the Sunbeam sale, due to the increasing popularity of the WFXT newscast and Tribune's closure of news departments at its stations in Philadelphia and San Diego, there were unconfirmed rumors and speculation that Tribune would shut down the WLVI news department and have the newscast outsourced to another station or even canceled altogether.

=== 7 News at 10 ===
If Tribune wanted to sell the station, they should have sold it to someone who was going to maintain it. All Channel 7 is going to do is close it down and 150 people are out of work the week before Christmas.

— Jack Hynes, WLVI-TV news anchor from 1984 to 2006, on the Sunbeam purchase

When Sunbeam took over, having not assumed much of WLVI's staff, a 10 p.m. newscast from WHDH began to air on channel 56. In its first sweeps period, it attracted less than a quarter of the viewership of WFXT. However, the program endured. In 2009, the newscast was the first in Boston to have a permanent lineup of two female anchors.

In 2017, when WHDH disaffiliated from NBC, that station also began airing the 10 p.m. newscast. It had previously threatened to do so in 2009 and pre-empt The Jay Leno Show.

=== Notable former on-air staff ===
- Michael Barkann – sportscaster
- Mike Crispino – sportscaster
- Bob Gamere – sports anchor/reporter
- Natalie Jacobson – anchor and public affairs director
- Uma Pemmaraju – anchor

== Technical information ==
=== Subchannels ===
WHDH and WLVI broadcast from a tower in Newton, Massachusetts. The stations' signals are multiplexed:

Subchannels of WHDH and WLVI
License	Subchannel	Res.	Short name	Programming
WHDH	7.1	1080i	WHDH	Independent
WHDH	7.2	480i	DEFY	Defy
WLVI	56.1	1080i	WLVI	The CW
WLVI	56.2	480i	BUZZR	Buzzr (4:3)

=== Analog-to-digital conversion ===
WLVI began broadcasting a digital signal on April 15, 2003. WLVI shut down its analog signal, over UHF channel 56, on June 12, 2009, the official date on which full-power television stations in the United States transitioned from analog to digital broadcasts under federal mandate. The station's digital signal continued to broadcast on its pre-transition UHF channel 41.

=== Spectrum reallocation ===
On February 15, 2017, Sunbeam Television owner Ed Ansin told The Boston Globe that he had sold WLVI's broadcast frequency in the FCC's spectrum auction for an undisclosed amount he described as "a lot of money"; this was later revealed by the FCC as a market-high figure of $162.1 million. The station has continued operations on virtual channel 56 through a channel-share arrangement with sister station WHDH, which took effect on January 9, 2018.
