= Midnight Monster Hop =

- Country of origin: United States

Production
- Production company: Castle Blood Entertainment

Original release
- Network: HSTV
- Release: October 7, 2006 – 2008

Midnight Monster Hop is a horror host television show that first aired in 2006 on HSTV in Uniontown, Pennsylvania.

In February 2008, the show began airing on WPXI/RTN Pittsburgh, and as of May 23, 2009 became available nationwide on select Retro Television Network affiliates, showing cult and B horror films with introductions, jokes, and skits inserted between movie segments. The Show was pulled off Retro Television by Ricky, after a contract dispute, so it lost its national reach, though many local RTV affiliates still run MMH instead of other shows that RTV picked up. A good example was WXYZ-TV's RTV subchannel, which aired it due to WMYD-TV being the originating station of Wolfman Mac's Chiller Drive-In, which RTV picked up for national broadcast.

Midnight Monster Hop may still be seen on many independent stations around the country.

== Cast ==
Featured cast members include:

- Gravely MacCabre (Ricky Dick) - Show Host
- Grizelda MacCabre (Karen Schnaubelt Turner Dick) - Co-Host
- Skully MacCabre (Caitlin Dick) - Daughter
- Whiplash (Sarah Black) Malevolent Vampire
- Deliria (Heather Curtis) House Zombie
- Prof Scrye (Chris Handa) Occult Cultural Anthropologist
- Uncle Vlad (Marty Gear) Joke Telling Vampire
- Vapor (Ame Matay) Dead Bride
- Madam Spooky (Dusti Lewars) Musicologist Vampire

== Featured Movies ==
Some of the horror movies featured in Midnight Monster Hop include:

- Revolt of the Zombies
- Countess Dracula
- House on Haunted Hill

== Awards ==
Midnight Monster Hop was nominated for a Rondo Hatton Classic Horror Awards (aka a "Rondo Award") in 2008, 2009, and 2010.

== Production ==
Midnight monster hop was filmed on location at the old location of Castle Blood in Beallsville, PA. All post-2011 content is now filmed at the new Castle Blood in Monessen, PA. Midnight Monster Hop is a combination of traditional horror hosting and a celebration of all things Halloween. The show features the music of King Dapper Combo and ends each episode with the tag line, "It's Midnight Somewhere!"

== In the media ==
- Beallsville couple stars in TV show
- Castle Blood brings back scary, late-night fun to local TV
- An Interview With Ricky Dick
