= Ghast =

Ghast may refer to:

- A creature in H.P. Lovecraft's novella The Dream-Quest of Unknown Kadath
- Ghast (Dungeons & Dragons), an undead creature in the Dungeons & Dragons role-playing game
- A creature in the Spook's series by Joseph Delaney
- Cliff-ghast, a creature in the His Dark Materials trilogy
- Ghast, a creature in the video game Minecraft

== See also ==
- Ghastly (disambiguation)
