= WJBK =

Television station in Detroit

- Detroit, Michigan; United States
- Channels: Digital: 7 (VHF); Virtual: 2
- Branding: Fox 2 Detroit; Fox 2 News

Programming
- Affiliations: 2.1: Fox; for others, see § Subchannels

Ownership
- Owner: Fox Television Stations; (New World Communications of Detroit, Inc.)

History
- First air date: October 24, 1948
- Former call signs: WJBK-TV (1948–1998)
- Former channel numbers: Analog: 2 (VHF, 1948–2009); Digital: 58 (UHF, 1998–2009)
- Former affiliations: CBS (1948–1994); DuMont (secondary, 1948–1955); Paramount (secondary, 1952–1955)
- Call sign meaning: Derived from former sister station WJBK radio (now WLQV)

Technical information
- Licensing authority: FCC
- Facility ID: 73123
- ERP: 27.2 kW
- HAAT: 314 m (1,030 ft)
- Transmitter coordinates: 42°27′38″N 83°12′50″W

Links
- Public license information: Public file; LMS
- Website: www.fox2detroit.com

WJBK (channel 2) is a television station in Detroit, Michigan, United States. Owned and operated by the Fox network through its Fox Television Stations division, the station maintains studios and transmitter facilities on West 9 Mile Road in the Detroit suburb of Southfield.

WJBK's over-the-air signal covers all of Metro Detroit, along with Southwestern Ontario, Canada, surrounding the city of Windsor. The station is also carried on most cable systems in southeast Michigan, southwestern Ontario and northwest Ohio.

== History ==
=== CBS affiliate (1948–1994) ===
The WJBK circle 2 logo, used from 1978 to 1983.

WJBK-TV first signed on the air on October 24, 1948. It was the third television station to sign-on in Detroit and Michigan, after WWJ-TV (channel 4, now WDIV-TV) and WXYZ-TV (channel 7)—all of which have signed on in a 14-month timeframe. Despite Detroit being a major television market, it only accommodated three VHF allocations due to being shortspaced between Flint (channel 12) and Saginaw (channel 5) to the north; Lansing (channels 6 and 10) to the west; Toledo (channels 11 and 13) to the south; and Cleveland (channels 3, 5 and 8); Windsor, Ontario (channel 9); and London, Ontario (channel 10) to the east. For this reason, WJBK was assigned the final VHF channel in Detroit.

At sign on, the first program broadcast by WJBK was a presentation of Lucky Pup at 6:15 p.m.. The station was originally an affiliate of both CBS and the DuMont Television Network. It was originally owned by Fort Industry Broadcasting, owned by George B. Storer and then based in nearby Toledo, Ohio. Fort Industry, which would later be renamed Storer Broadcasting, also owned WJBK radio (1500 AM, now WLQV), and 93.1 WJBK-FM (now WUFL). The station originally operated from Detroit's Masonic Temple until 1956, when its operations were moved to a purpose-built studio facility on Second Avenue in Detroit's New Center section, which would be occupied by PBS member station WTVS for nearly 40 years and is now being reconstructed for use as headquarters for the nonprofit Midnight Golf Program. WJBK-TV would eventually become an exclusive CBS affiliate by 1955, when Windsor, Ontario-based CKLW-TV (channel 9, now CBC O&O CBET-DT) became a DuMont affiliate. WJBK first broadcast in color around 1956. In 1970, the station moved to its current broadcast facilities on West Nine Mile Road in Southfield. Like most studio facilities built by Storer during that time, it resembles a Southern antebellum mansion.

The station went through a number of ownership and management changes with its parent companies in the 1980s and 1990s. In 1985, the equity firm Kohlberg Kravis Roberts (KKR) acquired Storer Communications, Incorporated in a leveraged buyout. Storer spurned offers from Knight-Ridder Newspapers, Tele-Communications, Inc. and Scripps-Howard Broadcasting Co., though Scripps-Howard would successfully acquire cross-town rival ABC owned and operated station WXYZ-TV in 1986 after the ABC-Capital Cities Communications merger was approved by federal regulators. KKR then sold all of the Storer broadcast assets, including WJBK, to Gillett Communications in 1987, after an attempt to sell the stations to Lorimar-Telepictures in 1986 failed. When Gillett went bankrupt in 1992, it reorganized the ownership of its television stations into SCI Television. The following year, in 1993, SCI was acquired by the film and television production company New World Communications.

=== Switch to Fox station (1994–present) ===
In May 1994, News Corporation, then-parent of the Fox network, purchased a 20% ownership stake (amounting to a $500 million investment) in WJBK's owner New World Communications. Fox made the investment to comply with their winning bid for the broadcast rights to the NFL's National Football Conference. Fox outbid CBS for the NFL broadcast rights on the condition that it would improve the network's affiliate coverage in the larger television markets. As a result of Fox's investment, New World agreed to switch the network affiliations of most of the company's stations, including WJBK, to Fox. While WKBD-TV (channel 50) had been the Fox affiliate in Detroit since the network debuted on October 9, 1986, and had grown to be one of the network's strongest affiliates, Fox still considered WJBK a far-more desirable affiliation prospect on the strength of its VHF signal and the station's longtime news department.

WJBK became Detroit's new Fox affiliate on December 11, 1994, after the station's affiliation contract with CBS ended, ending its 45-year affiliation with that network. With the switch, regular season games of the Detroit Lions' continued to air on WJBK, although there was a brief three-month interruption in coverage due to CBS losing the NFC rights for the first three months of Fox's NFC telecasts due to WKBD airing them. After losing Fox, WKBD was briefly an independent before joining the newly launched UPN a month later.

CBS found it difficult to find a new home in Detroit. WXYZ and Cleveland sister station WEWS-TV were both heavily wooed to become CBS affiliates, but the E. W. Scripps Company signed an affiliation deal with ABC in June 1994 that renewed the network's affiliations with both stations. WDIV was not an option as that station was in the middle of a long-term affiliation contract with NBC at the time. As a result, CBS was forced to deal with the market's lower-rated UHF outlets, none of which had the kind of signal penetration that WJBK had. As a contingency plan, CBS signed a long-term affiliation deal with WTOL in Toledo, Ohio; which provides city-grade coverage to most of Detroit's southern suburbs and grade B coverage of Detroit itself. It also persuaded Mid-Michigan's longtime NBC affiliate, WNEM-TV, to switch to CBS; WNEM provided stronger coverage of Detroit's outer northern suburbs than did the market's longtime CBS affiliate, WEYI-TV.

With just days to go before WJBK was due to switch to Fox, CBS faced the prospect of having to import WTOL, WNEM, and WLNS on area cable providers until it could find a replacement affiliate. CBS would end up purchasing low-rated UHF independent station WGPR-TV (channel 62, now WWJ-TV) in September 1994. The last CBS network program to air on WJBK was a first-run episode of Walker, Texas Ranger at 10 p.m. Eastern Time on December 10, 1994; channel 2 officially became a Fox affiliate the next day, when the network's programming lineup moved to the station from WKBD; the first Fox network program to air on the station as a full-time affiliate was Fox NFL Sunday at noon that day, which led into that afternoon's NFL doubleheader: an early game between the Tampa Bay Buccaneers and the Los Angeles Rams and a mid-afternoon game between the San Francisco 49ers and the San Diego Chargers.

Until channel 62 built a new transmitter in 1999, WTOL served as the default CBS affiliate for most of the southern portion of the market, while WNEM served the northern portion and WLNS served the western portion.

As a result of the network switch, WJBK changed its branding from "TV 2" to "Fox 2" by the fall of 1995 (becoming one of the few New World stations that switched to the network to adhere to the network's branding conventions before Fox's buyout of New World). Fox Television Stations bought New World's ten Fox-affiliated stations, including WJBK, in July 1996; the purchase was finalized on January 22, 1997, with channel 2 becoming a Fox owned-and-operated station as a result.

On December 14, 2017, The Walt Disney Company, owner of WXYZ-TV's affiliated network ABC, announced its intent to buy WJBK's parent company, 21st Century Fox, for $66.1 billion; the sale, which closed on March 20, 2019, excluded WJBK as well as the Fox network, the MyNetworkTV programming service, Fox News, Fox Sports 1, the Big Ten Network and the Fox Television Stations unit, which were all transferred to the newly-formed Fox Corporation.

== Programming ==
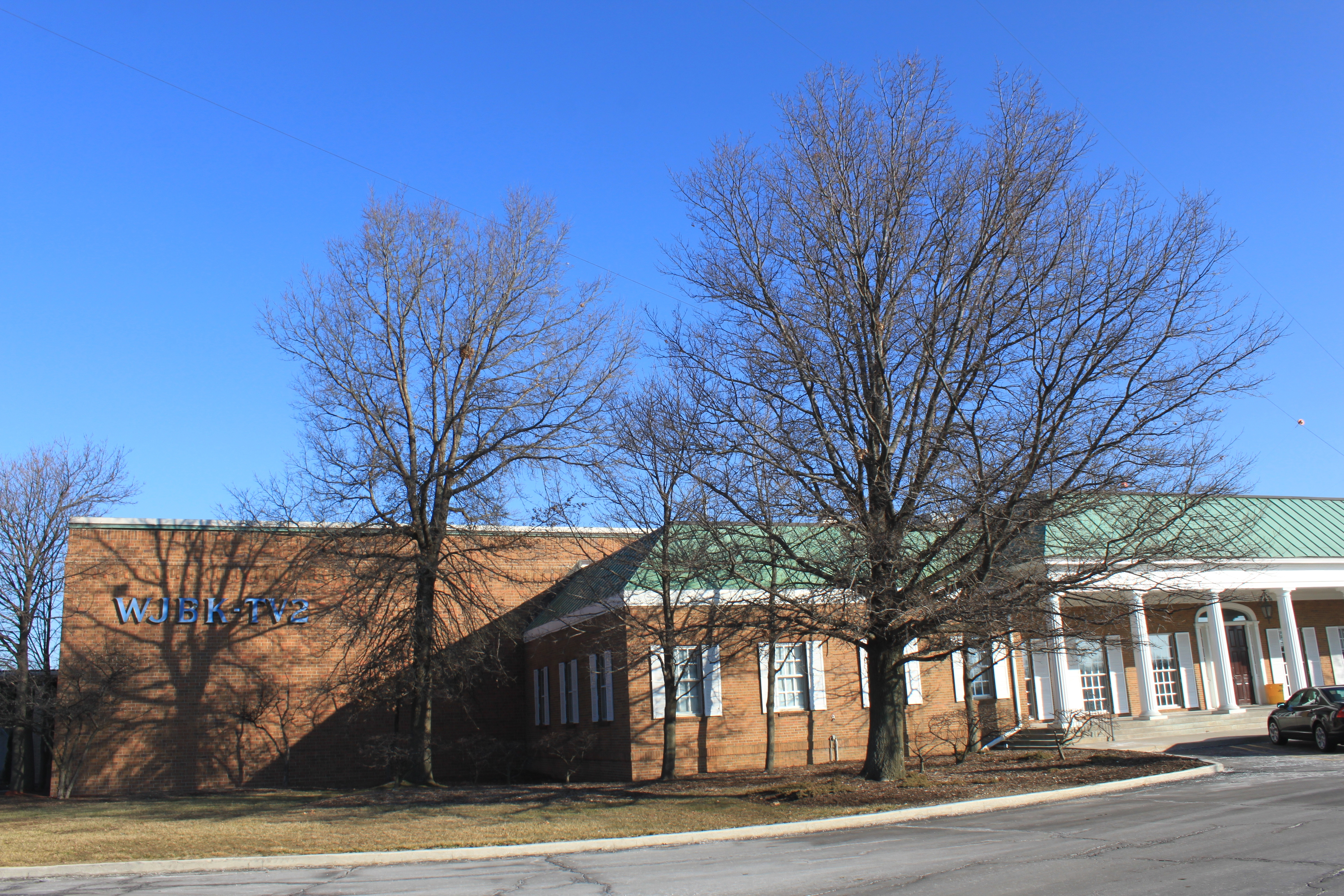
WJBK's studios in Southfield, Michigan.

=== Local productions ===
Some of WJBK's early productions included popular children's shows. Milky's Movie Party starring Milky the Clown, played by magician Clarence R. Cummings Jr., was one of the station's first locally produced children's programs from 1950 to 1955. The program featured a mix of cartoons and westerns with Cummings performing magic tricks with other acts in front of a live audience. Cummings would eventually take the Milky character to WXYZ-TV and the former WWJ-TV (now WDIV).

Other original WJBK children's programs included a cowboy-themed show with Sagebrush Shorty, played by ventriloquist Ted Lloyd, with his sidekick dummy Skinny Dugan that aired from 1956 to 1960, featuring a mix of children's activities and various other characters that interacted with Lloyd. That program was followed by another WJBK children's favorite, Jungle-La with wildlife expert "B'wana" Don Hunt, that aired from 1960 to 1963. Hunt with his sidekick chimpanzee Bongo Bailey hosted cartoons and taught viewers about various wildlife. Hunt moved to Africa in 1964 and managed a wildlife preserve in Kenya responsible for saving some species from extinction. After airing first on the former WWJ-TV and CKLW-TV, performer Art Cervi would obtain the Bozo the Clown franchise for Detroit and perform the character at WJBK beginning in 1975. During its run at the station, the program would be syndicated from WJBK to cities including New York City, Los Angeles, Las Vegas and Wichita, Kansas.

WJBK also produced one of Detroit's first morning talk shows, Ladies' Day with Chuck Bergeson, which aired from 1952 to 1959. The hour-long show included games, contests, and interviews with the biggest stars of the time including Lucille Ball and Red Skelton. Bergeson also hosted other WJBK shows in the 1950s including Your TV Golf Pro and The Name Game. From 1967 to 1983, Sir Graves Ghastly, played by actor Lawson J. Deming, hosted WJBK's assorted sci-fi and horror movies on Saturday afternoons; the humorous character became a popular figure in Detroit television. Deming had originally come to the station as a puppeteer and voice actor for the children's program Woodrow the Woodsman when that show moved from Cleveland's WKYC-TV to WJBK in 1966. In addition to playing the character in Cleveland, he also played Sir Graves on WTOP-TV in Washington, D.C. at the same time.

With This Ring was a nationally syndicated religious program produced at the studios of WJBK from the early 1970s through the mid-1990s. The weekly 15-minute show hosted by Roman Catholic priest Raymond Schlinkert featured lectures and advice about marriage and family life. The program was syndicated to several other U.S. commercial stations, usually shown immediately following the station's sign-on or before sign-off on Sundays.

WJBK would also produce Sunday public affairs/interview shows over the years including Focus Detroit, hosted by reporters Woody Willis and Beverly Payne in 1973; Sunday in Detroit, hosted by news anchor Kathy O'Brien, would air around 1980 and WJBK business reporter and news anchor Murray Feldman also hosted a Sunday business and financial program in the mid-1990s called Moneywise. WJBK produced a local version of the syndicated program PM Magazine from 1978 to the mid-1980s. The show changed titles over the years eventually becoming known as PM Detroit – it also had various hosts included Ronnie Klemmer, Lorrie Kapp, Gary Cubberly and Mattie Majors. The station was also the Detroit home and active participant for comedian Jerry Lewis' annual MDA Labor Day Telethon for several years.

From 1983 to 1986, popular WJR (760 AM) morning radio host J. P. McCarthy hosted an evening interview show with newsmakers and people of interest called JP, as well as a similar program in the early 1990s entitled In Person with J.P. McCarthy. He also previously hosted sports interview show specials through the 1970s. In 1995, former WXYZ-TV news anchor Bill Bonds hosted the 11 p.m. talk/interview show, Bonds Tonight. Bonds eventually would end up anchoring and reporting on WJBK's newscasts.

=== Past program preemptions and deferrals ===
Even though WJBK was one of CBS' stronger affiliates, it would preempt or reschedule some network programs. As the flagship station of Detroit Tigers baseball from the 1950s to the 1970s, it would preempt network programming to televise games. From 1970 until the early 1980s, the station would air its own local morning newscast from 7 to 8 a.m. and then Good Morning, Detroit instead of the CBS Morning News. In 1992, it chose again not to air CBS This Morning in favor of its own local newscast. The station would regularly reschedule CBS' daytime game shows and it would also move the soap opera Guiding Light from its usual network airtime of 3 p.m. ET to 10 a.m., with episodes airing on a one-day delay. WJBK would also preempt the CBS late night schedule with syndicated reruns including Cheers and late night movies until the debut of the Late Show with David Letterman in 1993, when the station cleared the show at 11:35 p.m.

After the affiliation switch, WJBK maintained its existing schedule, with the exception of the expansion of its news programming including the move and conversion of its 11 p.m. newscast to an hour-long broadcast at 10 p.m. As Fox offered less network programming, especially during the daytime hours, WJBK would fill its schedule with more syndicated programs and off-network reruns. However, the station, like its fellow former New World stations, never ran the Fox Kids children's programming block. That block would remain on former Fox affiliate WKBD before eventually moving to WADL (channel 38) and then WDWB-TV (channel 20, now WMYD). In 2014, WJBK cleared Steve Rotfeld Productions' Xploration Station block, making it the first time the station has ever cleared Fox children's programming.

=== Sports programming ===
==== Detroit Tigers ====
From the 1950s to the 1970s, WJBK was a pioneer in Detroit sports broadcasting. In 1949, it was the first television station in Michigan to broadcast live Detroit Tigers baseball and Detroit Lions football games. From 1953 to 1974, WJBK served as the first flagship station of the Tigers Television Network with games broadcast on stations throughout Michigan, northern Indiana, and northwest Ohio. In the 1960s, longtime Tigers broadcaster and former player George Kell hosted the pregame show Tigers Warm Up on the field during batting practice. During the 2007 season, the station aired some regular season Tigers games produced by Fox Sports Detroit. In 2025, the Tigers announced that WJBK would simulcast 10 games from FanDuel Sports Network Detroit (the former Fox Sports Detroit), including the home opener on April 4. WJBK also airs Tigers games nationally through Fox's MLB package (including the Tigers' 2006 and 2012 World Series appearances); WJBK also aired select Tigers games featured on CBS' MLB coverage from 1990 to 1993.

==== Detroit Pistons ====
WJBK also televised Detroit Pistons games from the time that the team's relocated to Detroit from Fort Wayne, Indiana in 1957, until 1972; the team's games began airing on WKBD-TV the following season. The Pistons would also air on WJBK during nationally televised games on CBS from 1973 to 1990; WJBK televised both of the first two Pistons NBA Finals championships of 1989 and 1990 (game 5 of the latter series was the last NBA game aired on CBS).

==== Detroit Red Wings ====
Detroit Red Wings NHL games, produced again by Fox Sports Detroit, would also be aired on the station from 2003 to 2007. In March 2007, WJBK began broadcasting Red Wings games in high definition. A package of five Red Wings games, all simulcasts from FanDuel Sports Network Detroit, would return to the station in 2025. Previously the Red Wings aired on the station various times between 1956 and 1980 through broadcast rights held by CBS and again from 1995 to 1999 through Fox's contract with the NHL; this included the team's Stanley Cup Final victories in 1997 and 1998.

==== Detroit Lions ====
WJBK has had a long-standing relationship with the NFL's Detroit Lions (first with CBS, now Fox), having carried most of its games since 1956, when CBS started airing NFL games. Except for the first three months of the 1994 season (before the affiliation switch took effect), it has been the unofficial regular-season "home" station of the Lions ever since, including coverage of the team's Thanksgiving Day home games in odd-numbered years. For the first 15 weeks of the 1994 season, the games aired on lame-duck Fox outlet WKBD. However, regular season home games were subject to the NFL's local television blackout policy. This occurred five times during the Lions' winless season of 2008 when five home games were blacked out due to low ticket sales. However, in 2015, the NFL decided to lift the blackout rules on an experimental basis, meaning that Lions games were shown on Channel 2 regardless of ticket sales; this policy was continued the next season in 2016 as well, and has continued indefinitely as of 2019.

In previous years, WJBK had also televised Lions preseason games as the flagship station of the Detroit Lions Television Network and produced pregame and postgame shows. Those preseason broadcast rights were then held by WWJ-TV and then WXYZ-TV until 2015, when WJBK once again became the official preseason station of the Lions as well.

As a CBS affiliate, WJBK aired the network's coverage of Super Bowl XVI, which was hosted locally at the Pontiac Silverdome.

WJBK's sportscasters have also been team play-by-play announcers through the years with Van Patrick doing Tigers, Lions and Notre Dame Football games. Ray Lane would be paired with Hall of Fame announcer Ernie Harwell on Tigers' radio broadcasts from 1967 to 1972; and current sports director Dan Miller performs radio play by play for the Lions.

=== News operation ===
WJBK currently broadcasts 68½ hours of locally produced newscasts each week (with 11½ hours each weekday and 5½ hours each on Saturdays and Sundays); in regards to the number of hours devoted to news programming, it is the highest local newscast output among all broadcast television stations in the state of Michigan. In addition, WJBK produces a sports highlight program on Sunday nights following the 10 p.m. newscast called Sports Works (which is also the branding of the sports segments seen within its newscasts); the show is hosted by either WJBK sports director Dan Miller or sports anchor/reporter Woody Woodriffe, and typically features a roundtable discussion with members of the Detroit sports media including Sean Baligian, formerly of WDFN (1130 AM); Bob Wojnowski from the Detroit News; Pat Caputo from the Oakland Press and WXYT-FM (97.1) and Tony Ortiz from WXYT-FM.

WJBK operates a fleet of Ford E350 ENG vehicles with microwave transmission and video editing capabilities. The station also has (SNG) mobile satellite uplink capability. For aerial news coverage, WJBK shares a Eurocopter AS350BA A-star news helicopter with WXYZ-TV and WDIV-TV as part of a Local News Service agreement. The aircraft has HD video capability and goes by the call sign "Red Bird" (although WJBK brands the helicopter as "SkyFox"). In 2009, WJBK and WXYZ-TV expanded the LNS agreement to allow the sharing of local news video.

In an effort to cut expenses, WJBK and WXYZ's respective owners, Fox and the E. W. Scripps Company, established an LNS in all markets where both companies own stations. The stations pool newsgathering resources and share video during coverage of general news events. While the news department primarily focuses its local news coverage on southeastern Michigan, it also provides coverage of larger stories in southwestern Ontario, northern Ohio and the rest of Michigan.

==== TV-2 Eyewitness News ====
Through much of the 1960s and 1970s WJBK's TV-2 Eyewitness News dominated the newscast ratings in the Detroit market. This began with news anchor Jac LeGoff and grew when LeGoff was paired with newscaster John Kelly. Other popular longtime Detroit television personalities including Joe Weaver, Jerry Hodak, Van Patrick and Marilyn Turner would also be a part of WJBK's ratings success. The station's ratings would begin to wane in the mid-1970s after then-ABC O&O WXYZ-TV hired away WJBK's and WWJ-TV's top talent, including Kelly and Turner and eventually LeGoff and Hodak. WJBK's newscasts remained competitive in the 1970s with a new stable of talent including anchors Joe Glover, Robbie Timmons, Harry Gallagher, Murray Feldman and Terry Murphy. The station also had correspondents in bureaus at the Detroit City-County Building (Louis Miller), the Michigan state capital in Lansing and Washington, D.C. Nationally syndicated radio host George Noory was even a news producer at WJBK from 1974 to 1978, before becoming a news director at stations in Minneapolis and St. Louis. However, by 1980, the station's news ratings steeply declined with the growing dominance of WXYZ. Also by this time WDIV's new owners, Post-Newsweek Stations, were making aggressive changes to bolster its station's image and ratings from third place. By 1982, management at WJBK replaced most of the staff, which sank the station's news ratings further into third place, from where it would almost never recover.

With new management, WJBK's news department saw a resurgence by 1990 with new staff that included Sherry Margolis, Huel Perkins and the rehiring of former anchor Joe Glover. The station would also hire away news staff and talent away from top rated WXYZ including Rich Fisher, Dayna Eubanks, Catherine Lehan, Jerry Hodak and investigative reporter Vince Wade. The station revised its image with a new logo, graphics, music and news set and began airing Detroit's first 4 p.m. newscast as part of a three-hour evening news block with half-hour newscasts at 4, 5 and 6 pm. At the same time, the station also became Detroit's first television station to launch a weekend morning newscast. Overall, WJBK's news ratings would not improve enough to surpass WXYZ and WDIV, which would continue to go head-to-head for first place. The station would also begin to simulcast its late newscast on WADL, which lasted until 1998. It would also be among the first television stations in the country to air obituaries in 1995 during the Detroit newspaper strike.

==== Fox 2 News ====
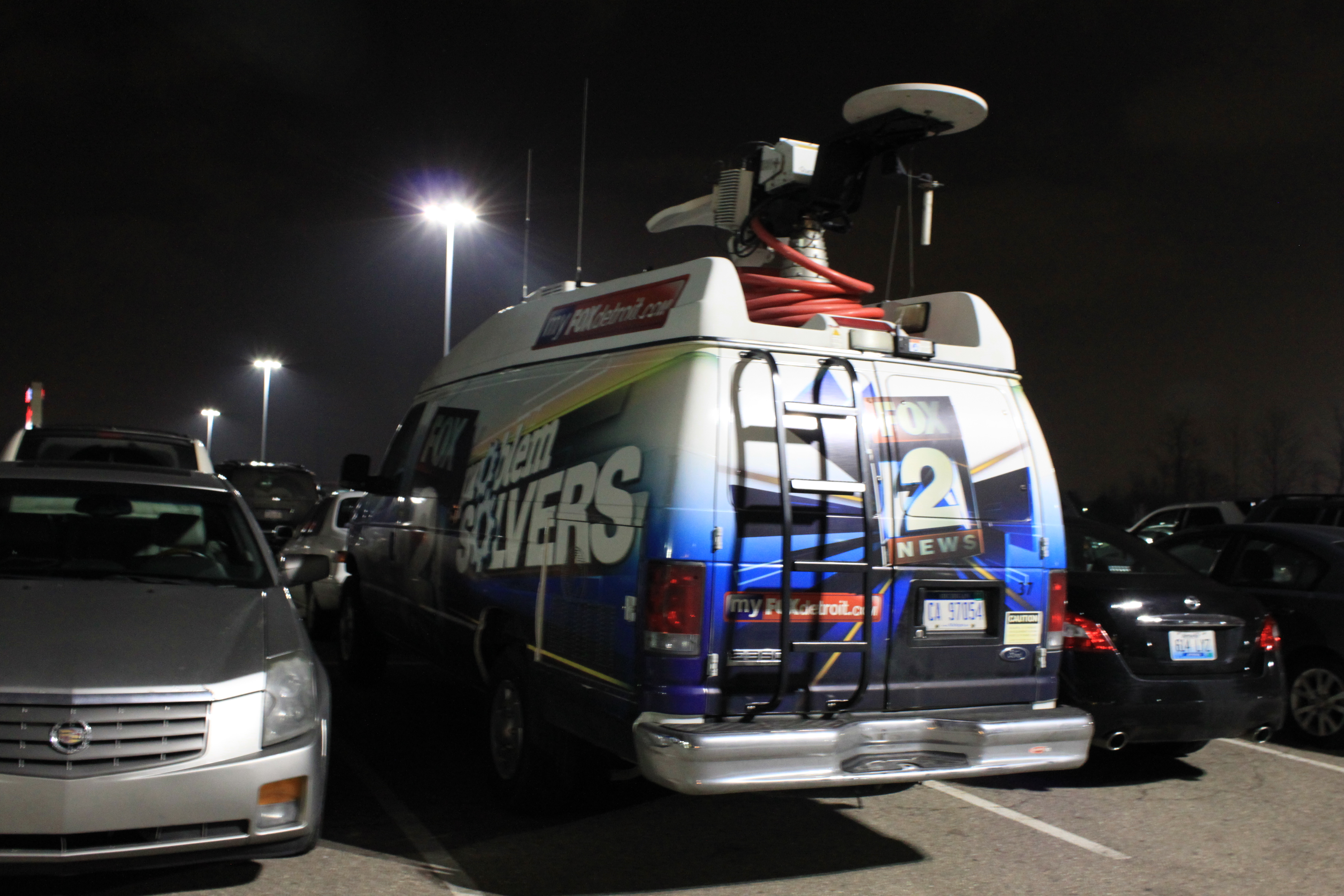
Fox 2 News Remote Van.

When WJBK switched affiliations from CBS to Fox in December 1994, the station adopted a news-intensive format. It has retained a news schedule similar to the one it had in its latter days as a CBS affiliate. The 35-minute 11 p.m. newscast was moved to 10 p.m. and expanded to an hour, and the weekday morning newscast was also expanded. The weekend 6 p.m. newscasts would also be expanded to one hour. WJBK now had a late local newscast in first place as it immediately overtook the hour-long 10 p.m. newscast that WKBD had at the time in the ratings. Eventually, WJBK would drop the 4 p.m. newscast, but the station's profile and ratings for its morning and 10 p.m. newscasts would surge with it out of direct competition from its main competitors WDIV and WXYZ. In 1995, the station would hire news anchor Bill Bonds after his departure from WXYZ-TV. Bonds would fill the 11 p.m. timeslot with a news/interview show, Bonds Tonight.

The newscasts were branded as Fox 2 Eyewitness News until 1997, when Fox took full ownership of the station and rebranded its newscasts as Fox 2 News. By that time, the station would also release its previous WXYZ hires. At the same time, Fox's news management brought on new talent including Dan Miller, Alan Lee and Monica Gayle from Seattle, as well as Rob Wolchek from Fresno, California. By 1998, the station would bolster its image by improving its investigative and consumer advocate unit and branding it as The Problem Solvers. It also adopted a slogan complementary to Detroit's working class heritage, "News That Works for You". On September 24, 2007, WJBK relaunched an 11 p.m. newscast, using the NewsEdge format originally used by Fox Tampa station WTVT. It also changed its logo, graphics and news theme to an image that became standard on the Fox O&O stations. In April 2008, the station became the first Fox-owned station (and the third television station in Detroit) to broadcast its news programming in high definition.

On September 12, 2016, WJBK added an extra half-hour to its 6 p.m. newscast.

==== Mornings ====
WJBK had a tradition of producing its own morning news shows instead of airing CBS' morning news programs, beginning with a 7:30 a.m. newscast in 1969. The newscast would soon expand to an hour starting at 7 am. It became a mix of news, interviews and features and would be renamed Good Morning, Detroit and eventually moved to 8 am. During its run, Vic Caputo would co-anchor separately with Beverly Payne, Ken Ford and Kathy O'Brien. Payne would be the first African-American female news anchor in Detroit. Good Morning, Detroit eventually became Morning Magazine, hosted by Kathy O'Brien and Gary Cubberly. In 1982, Morning Magazine was discontinued and briefly became Two's Company, also hosted by O'Brien and Cubberly. In 1992, the station preempted CBS' morning news program again when WJBK rehired Jerry Hodak from WXYZ to co-anchor Eyewitness News Morning. Just prior to that, WJBK also debuted Detroit's first weekend morning newscast, which was first anchored by former PM Magazine host Gary Cubberly. Competitor WDIV would follow with its own weekend morning newscast, as did eventually WXYZ. Since then, the station has broadcast more morning news hours than any other Detroit television station. In September 2009, the morning newscast was expanded to 5½ hours, airing from 4:30 to 10 am. In September 2011, Fox 2 News Morning expanded to 6½ hours from 4:30 to 11 am, where it joins the station's hour-long midday newscast at 11 am. WJBK has also had the longest-running midday newscast in the Detroit market, which originated in 1966 in the noon timeslot, before moving to 11 a.m. shortly after the switch to Fox.

On Wednesday, May 6, 2015, WJBK's morning show became the subject of notoriety for a blooper, wherein an anchor hoped the middle day of the week, which is often referred to as "hump day", would have clear skies, and turn out to be a "dry hump day". In the fall of 2018, WJBK begin expanding its current morning newscasts to 8 hours with addition of half-hour starting at 4 am. On September 19, 2022, Fox 2 News Morning expanded to noon, with the midday newscast pushed back into the noon hour.

==== Ratings ====
As of February 2012, WJBK's Fox 2 News Morning has consistently remained the Detroit market's highest-rated local morning newscast (6–7 a.m., 4.5 rating/17 share). After years of faltering at a distant third against WDIV and WXYZ, WJBK began to make gains in its audience growth in other newscasts. While WDIV continued to have the most-watched evening and late newscasts, WJBK's 10 p.m. news (7.5 rating/12 share) remains the highest-rated prime time newscast in Metro Detroit. Its early evening 5 and 5:30 p.m. newscasts (6.0/13) have surpassed WXYZ-TV's longtime dominant 5 p.m. newscast (5.8/13) for second place, while WJBK's 6 p.m. newscast (5.1/10) has become a very close third moving within one rating point to WXYZ's newscast in that timeslot (6.1/12). Since debuting in 2007, WJBK's 11 p.m. newscast Newsedge has been in third place overall (5.0 rating/9 share).

==== Notable current on-air staff ====
- Dan Miller – sports director; also SportsWorks host
- Lee Thomas – entertainment reporter
- Rob Wolchek – "Problem Solvers" investigative and "Hall of Shame" feature reporter

==== Notable former on-air staff ====
- Bill Bonds – news anchor and interviewer (1995–1998)
- Lawson J. Deming – played horror movie host Sir Graves Ghastly (1967–1983)
- Sonny Eliot – weathercaster (1980–1983)
- M. L. Elrick – investigative reporter
- Jerry Hodak – meteorologist (1965–1977) and news anchor (1992–1996)
- Amy Jacobson – reporter
- Ray Lane – sports anchor (1961–1982)
- Charlie LeDuff – investigative reporter (2012–December 2016)
- Joseph "J. P." McCarthy – interview show host (occasionally from 1972 to 1986)
- Fred McLeod – sports anchor/reporter (1981–1989)
- Terry Murphy – news anchor (1974–1975)
- George Noory – assignment editor/producer (mid-1970s)
- Van Patrick – sports director (1960–1974)
- Charles Pugh – anchor/reporter (1999–2009)
- Jeff Rossen – reporter (1998–2001)

== Technical information ==
=== Subchannels ===
The station's signal is multiplexed:

Subchannels of WJBK
Subchannel	Res.	Short name	Programming
2.1	720p	WJBK	Fox
2.2	480i	Movies!	Movies!
2.3	480i	Buzzr	Buzzr (4:3)
2.4	480i	WEST	WEST
2.5	480i	CATCHY	Catchy Comedy
2.6	480i	FOX WX	Fox Weather
20.3	480i	WMYD-MS	Ion Mystery (WMYD-DT3)

Broadcast on behalf of another station

=== Analog-to-digital conversion ===
WJBK began airing its digital high-definition feed, WJBK-DT, on its pre-transition UHF channel 58 starting on October 1, 1998. The station ended regular programming on its analog signal, over VHF channel 2, on June 12, 2009, per the U.S. Digital Television transition federal mandate. In concurrence, the station's digital signal switched to its assigned post-transition VHF channel 7 which was until that day occupied by WXYZ-TV's analog signal. WJBK was assigned its post-transition digital signal on May 7, 2007.

As part of the SAFER Act, WJBK kept an analog signal on the air for two additional weeks until June 26 to inform viewers of the digital television transition through a loop of public service announcements from the National Association of Broadcasters.

Digital television receivers continue to display the station's virtual channel as its former VHF analog channel 2. WJBK is the only American television station in the Detroit–Windsor television market that broadcasts its digital signal on the VHF band. Canadian station CBET-DT, broadcasting from McGregor, Ontario, is on VHF channel 9. All other Detroit–Windsor DTV stations are on the UHF band, which includes channels 14 to 36 after the FCC repack.

== Out-of-market coverage ==
=== Canada ===
WJBK also serves as a Fox station for other Canadian cable providers, including on Rogers Cable in the Canadian capital of Ottawa, Ontario. It was also one of five Detroit television stations seen in Canada on satellite provider Shaw Direct. As of April 2009, Shaw Broadcast Services (formerly CANCOM) replaced WJBK's signal with Rochester, New York Fox affiliate WUHF. As a CBS affiliate, WJBK was carried on Cable Atlantic (now Rogers Cable) in Newfoundland and Labrador and Nova Scotia from 1985 until it affiliated with Fox in 1994. Both provinces are now served by Boston CBS O&O WBZ-TV.

Coverage on cable providers outside the Detroit–Windsor market may be subject to syndex and network blackouts in the United States and simsubbing in Canada.

=== Newscasts ===
When WJBK became a Fox station, WGKI/WGKU (now WFQX-TV/WFUP), the Fox affiliate in Cadillac, Michigan, stopped simulcasting WKBD's 10 p.m. newscast in favor of WJBK's; this arrangement ended when WGKI began producing its own 10 p.m. newscast in 2000. In January 2007, WFQX began simulcasting WJBK's morning newscast from 6 to 8 a.m. under the title Michigan's Fox News Morning. The simulcasts were made possible with an agreement that offered northern Michigan businesses advertising opportunities during the newscast. WFQX would also air the second half of WJBK's 10 p.m. newscast following its own half-hour 10 p.m. newscast. WFQX would drop WJBK's newscasts altogether in October 2007, after the station was sold and CBS affiliate WWTV began producing WFQX's 10 p.m. and morning newscasts.

== See also ==
- Media in Detroit
- Channel 2 virtual TV stations in the United States
