= WTVS =

Television station in Detroit

- Detroit, Michigan; United States
- Channels: Digital: 20 (UHF); Virtual: 56
- Branding: Detroit PBS

Programming
- Affiliations: 56.1: PBS; for others, see § Subchannels

Ownership
- Owner: Detroit Public Media
- Sister stations: WRCJ-FM

History
- First air date: October 3, 1955
- Former channel numbers: Analog: 56 (UHF, 1955–2009); Digital: 43 (UHF, 2000–2020)
- Former affiliations: NET (1955–1970)
- Call sign meaning: "Television for Southeast Michigan"

Technical information
- Licensing authority: FCC
- Facility ID: 16817
- ERP: 345 kW
- HAAT: 323 m (1,060 ft)
- Transmitter coordinates: 42°26′52.5″N 83°10′23.1″W

Links
- Public license information: Public file; LMS
- Website: www.detroitpbs.org

WTVS (channel 56) is a PBS member television station in Detroit, Michigan, United States, owned by Detroit Public Media. Its main studios are located at the Riley Broadcast Center and HD Studios on Clover Court in Wixom, with an additional studio at the Maccabees Building on the campus of Wayne State University on Woodward Avenue in Midtown Detroit. The station's transmitter is located at 8 Mile and Meyers Road in Oak Park (on a tower shared with independent station WMYD, channel 20, and CBS owned-and-operated station WWJ-TV, channel 62). Detroit Public Media partners with the Stanley and Judith Frankel Family Foundation in the management of classical and jazz music station WRCJ-FM (90.9).

== History ==
The station first signed on the air on October 3, 1955, as the 17th educational station to go on air. WTVS began broadcasting in color in 1968. The studios were originally located at 9345 Lawton in Detroit, along with the studios of WRCJ; WTVS moved to the former WJBK studio facility in the New Center area of Detroit in 1971. WTVS vacated the facility in the 1990s, and the building would be used for its fixed satellite services until 2009, when it was sold to the Mosaic Youth Theatre of Detroit; it is currently being reconstructed for use as headquarters for the non-profit Midnight Golf Program.

Prior to the digital TV switchover, WTVS transmitted its analog signal from a 1,000-foot (305 m) tower located near the intersection of 11 Mile and Inkster Roads in Southfield, along with the analog signal of WMYD (channel 20) and then-CW O&O WKBD-TV (channel 50). Today, only WKBD-TV and Ion Television affiliate WPXD-TV (channel 31) broadcast from that tower.

On January 11, 2016, Detroit Public Television announced a partnership with WKAR-TV, the PBS station serving Mid-Michigan operated by Michigan State University, in which they would jointly operate a 24-hour children's television service to be carried by both stations. The partnership culminated in the establishment of the Michigan Learning Channel in 2021 which is carried by all six PBS member organizations throughout Michigan.

In 2023, Detroit Public Television sold its headquarters in Wixom, Michigan, and temporarily relocated to another site in the area. On April 16, 2024, the broadcaster announced that it had purchased the 234 Piquette Avenue building in Detroit, and would convert it into a new $30 million campus expected to open in 2026. Concurrently, the organization announced that it had been renamed Detroit Public Media, and that WTVS would be rebranded as Detroit PBS.

== Controversy ==
In 2005, WTVS declined to air the controversial Postcards from Buster episode "Sugartime!", even after the show's Boston-based producing station, WGBH, converted it to the status of being specifically shown to individual stations. The decision was made after PBS received a complaint from then-newly appointed Education Secretary Margaret Spellings, who was upset its storyline, in which the main character, Buster Baxter, pays a visit to Hinesburg, Vermont, to learn how maple sugar is made, and interacts with several children who have lesbian parents. The controversy surrounding the episode led to it being removed from PBS Kids Go!'s national broadcast schedule.

== Technical information ==
=== Subchannels ===
The station's signal is multiplexed:

Subchannels of WTVS
| Subchannel | Res. | Short name | Programming |
|---|---|---|---|
| 56.1 | 1080i | WTVS-HD | PBS |
| 56.2 | 1080i | D-KIDS | PBS Kids |
| 56.3 | 480i | D-CREAT | Create |
| 56.4 | 480i | D-WORLD | World |
| 56.5 | 480i | D-MLC | Michigan Learning Channel |

=== Analog-to-digital conversion ===
WTVS became the first public broadcaster in the state of Michigan to offer a digital high-definition feed, launching their simulcast on UHF 43 in October 2000 (exact date not yet known). The station shut down its analog signal, over UHF channel 56, at noon on April 16, 2009; the switchover occurred after a presentation of the national anthems of Canada ("O Canada") and the United States ("The Star-Spangled Banner"). WTVS management cited repeated failures of the station's 28-year-old analog transmitter as the reason for ceasing its analog signal on April 16 rather than the June 12 transition date for full-power stations (the analog transmitter had failed seven times between January 1 and April 16 alone). The station's digital signal continued to broadcast on its pre-transition UHF channel 43, using virtual channel 56.

On October 12, 2009, WTVS upgraded to a new 600 kW transmitter, tripling its effective radiated power and vastly increasing the coverage area of its signal.

On January 13, 2017, WTVS re-organized its digital subchannels when it added the new PBS Kids full-time service on 56.2, with PBS World moving to 56.4. Two months later on March 8, WTVS announced the move of its physical channel from UHF channel 43 to 20 due to the removal of channels 38-51 from the UHF band after the 2016 American spectrum auction.

== Cable coverage ==
WTVS is carried on most cable television providers in Southeast Michigan, Southwestern Ontario, Saskatchewan and parts of the British Columbia Southern Interior, with KCTS-TV in Seattle also carried in B.C. WTVS is one of five Detroit television stations available in Canada on cable through Shaw Broadcast Services and on satellite provider Shaw Direct; it began to be distributed by Cancom (now Shaw Broadcast Services) in 1983 as the PBS station signal for Canadian cable television systems too distant to receive a border station over-the-air, and like other border PBS stations has developed a strong membership base and support where it is carried in Canada, especially in Ontario.

== See also ==
- Media in Detroit
