= Zoo key =

Novelty key used at American zoos

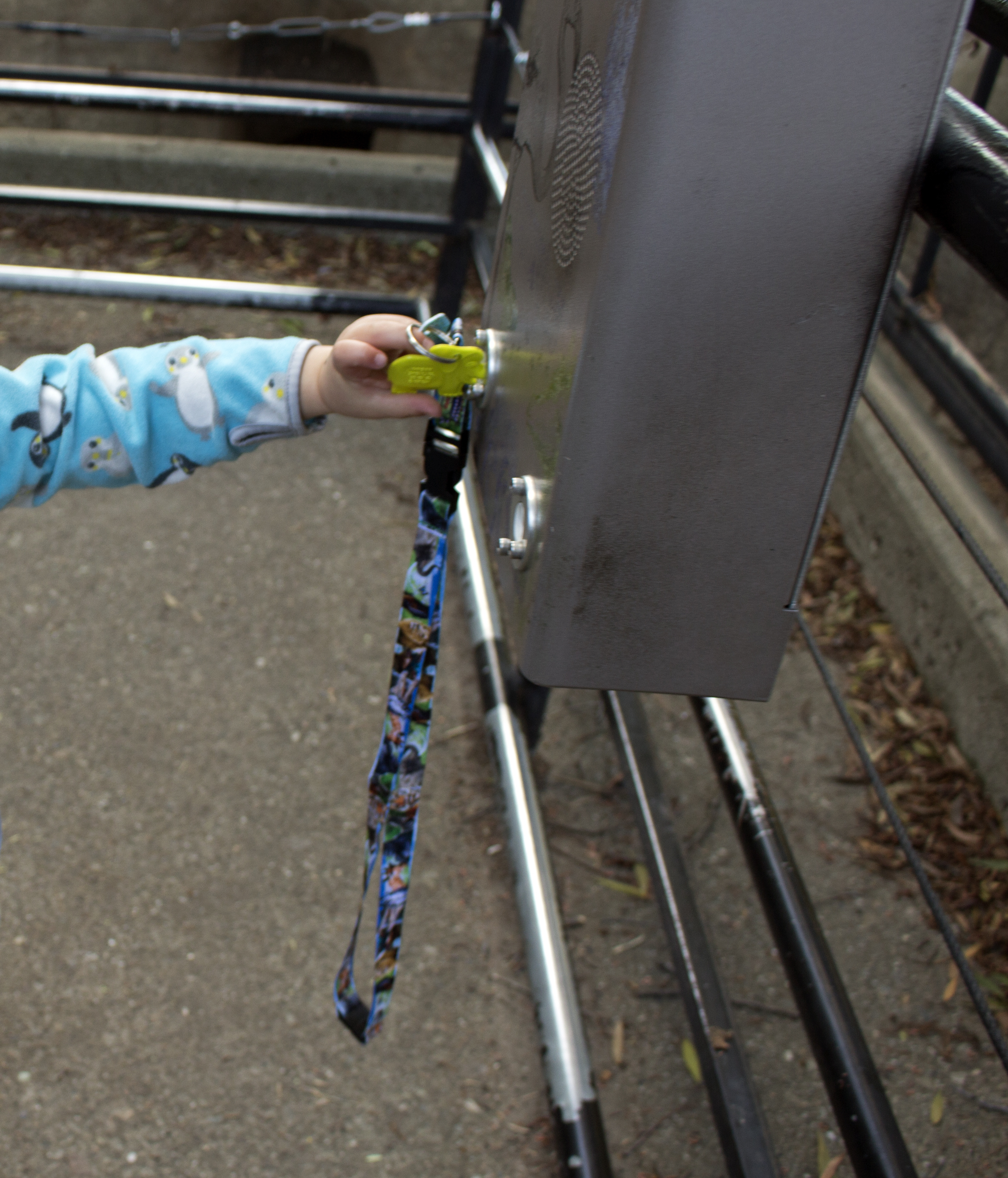
Child operating talking storybook in 2017 using an elephant key.

A zoo key is a large novelty key used to activate talking storybooks at American zoos. These were used by various zoos, largely in the latter half of the 20th century, as part of a system which played audio recordings describing exhibits. The keys were typically made from brightly colored plastic in the shape of animals, although some zoos issued the keys in non-animal shapes.

The first generation of keys were in the shape of an elephant, with the trunk being the blade of the key. This was commonly known as "Trunkey the Elephant" (sometimes spelled Trunky). At the Cleveland Zoo, it was called "Packey".

Installations included zoos in Portland (see Packy), San Francisco, Cleveland, Detroit, Philadelphia, Cincinnati, New Orleans, and New York.

US Patent

== Children's Fairyland ==
The system was invented and patented by Bruce Sedley (1925–2012), in response to a request from William Penn Mott of the Oakland, California, Park Department. Originally known as "Talking Storybooks", (and implemented with a different shaped key), the first version of the system was installed at Children's Fairyland in 1958.

Predating the Talking Storybooks, Children's Fairyland had a similar system based on coin-operated record players, which would frequently break down. Sedley devised a more reliable implementation using the more modern magnetic tape system, with the audio program recorded on a tape loop. The concept was based on message repeater devices Sedley was using in his recording studio. The first units produced used Sedley's voice; later production switched to using celebrity voices.

As of September 2026, the system is still in use there, with new "Magic Keys" available for purchase at $3.

A version of the Talking Storybook system is still being produced as of 2020, manufactured by The Talking Storybook Company, in Santa Cruz, California. Sedley later went on to invent a magnetic door key, an early version of room keys commonly used in hotels.

== San Francisco ==
The San Francisco Zoo was one of the first customers, installing 40 units in 1959. It was at this point that the "Talking Storybook" name was first used. The storyboxes played the "All the animals at the zoo are jumping up and down for you" jingle. This tune was also used by other zoos, as in a TV commercial for the Philadelphia Zoo.

== Philadelphia ==
The system was installed at the Philadelphia Zoo circa 1959 and was prominently featured in a TV commercial of the era. (Note: Sources differ on the installation date. The Philadelphia Inquirer states 1960, but the YouTube video shows the system and claims to be from the 1950s.) This original installation was removed in 2007; it was brought back by popular demand in 2020 as part of the "Creatures of Habitat" exhibit which features life-size lego animal sculptures and 20 newly installed storyboxes, which offer audio in both English and Spanish. Keys are available for sale, but heirloom keys from the original system will also work. The new system encompasses some environment-friendly features; the storybooks are solar powered, and the new keys are made from recycled plastic. The new keys are available in lion, bear, and gorilla shapes.

== Cleveland ==
The Cleveland Zoo had the original system installed from 1959 to 1980. The scripts for the audio recordings were written by Fletcher Reynolds, the director of the zoo. According to various sources, recordings were either done by professional voice actors in Hollywood or by local television performer, Linn Sheldon. The system was re-installed in 2017, named ZooKey, with sponsorship from KeyBank, as part of the Cleveland Metroparks' 100th anniversary. The installation includes over two dozen stations.

== Sacramento ==
The Sacramento Zoo issues keys in multiple colors and animal shapes. As of 2011, keys were available as orange tigers, gold giraffes, and yellow lions.

== Other locations ==
- Audubon Zoo New Orleans
- Belle Isle Children's Zoo and Aquarium
- Cincinnati Zoo
- Como Park Zoo
- Crandon Park Zoo
- Detroit Zoo
- Fort Worth Zoo
- Indianapolis Zoo
- Louisville Zoo
- Oakland Zoo
- Omaha Henry Doorly Zoo
- Oregon Zoo
- Portland Zoo
- Potawatomi Zoo
- Reid Park Zoo
- San Diego Safari Park
- Toledo Zoo & Aquarium
- Turtle Back Zoo
- Woodland Park Zoo Seattle, Wa.
- Zoo Miami
- Storyland (Fresno, California)
- Deer Forest (Coloma, Michigan; permanently closed)

== System longevity ==
Keys were sold with the intent that children would hold on to them and bring them back on subsequent visits to the zoo. This has continued to be true over the many years that the system has been in use. There are 50-year-old keys which still work in modern-day storybook devices.

Children's Fairyland executive director C.J. Hirschfield noted, "I constantly hear from 30-, 40- and 50-somethings, 'I still have my key!' And I always reply, 'And it still works!'"

== Keys as memorabilia ==
Old keys have become collectable, with typical keys being worth anywhere from a few dollars to $225 for highly prized and rare examples. One notable collector, Mark Lyons, got his first key at the Detroit Zoo during a grade school field trip. The advent of eBay led to him collecting the keys and he estimates he has 350–400 keys from various zoos.
