= Wolfman Mac's Chiller Drive-In =

- Also known as: Wolfman Mac's Nightmare Sinema
- Genre: Horror / Science-fiction / Comedy
- Created by: Mac Kelly
- Developed by: Mac Kelly
- Written by: Dean Vanderkolk; Dean C. McKinney; Benjamin Bock
- Directed by: Mike C. Hartman; Taryn Shick; Frank J. Levanduski
- Presented by: Mac Kelly
- Starring: Mac Kelly; Adam Showers; Nina Kircher; Karie Nora
- Voices of: Mac Kelly
- Country of origin: United States
- Original language: English
- No. of seasons: 4
- No. of episodes: 65

Production
- Executive producers: Mac Kelly; Kurt Eli Mayry; Douglas Schultze
- Production locations: Pontiac, Michigan, USA
- Camera setup: George Melnyk; Joseph Calhoun
- Running time: 120 minutes
- Production company: Stay Creepy Productions

Original release
- Network: WMYD; MyNetworkTV; Retro Television Network
- Release: July 1, 2007 – October 29, 2011

Related
- Wolfman Mac's Nightmare Sinema

Wolfman Mac's Chiller Drive-In is a "horror host" series hosted by "Wolfman" Mac Kelly, which aired Saturday nights at 10 pm from March 14, 2008 to October 29, 2011, on various local television stations in Detroit and on the Retro Television Network nationally. The show typically features vintage sci-fi and horror films like Nosferatu, Teenage Zombies and Night of the Living Dead, enhanced with retro commercials, nostalgic clips, and skits. Each episode is recorded at Erebus Haunted Attraction in Pontiac, MI.

== Format ==
=== Movies ===
The program shows horror and sci-fi movies that are in the public domain such as Night of the Living Dead and Evil Brain from Outer Space.

== Characters ==
The show is hosted by the titular character, Wolfman Mac, portrayed by Mac Kelly, and his sidekick, Boney Bob, a plastic skeleton purchased from K-Mart.

Both the cast and crew of the show are volunteers and have made appearances at the Motor City Comic Con.

- Mac Kelly as Wolfman Mac
- Adam Showers as Morbid Melvin
- Nina Kircher as Madame Nina
- Mark Knote as TORG
- Steve Czapiewski as Dr. Valentine
- Susan Valenti as Rubella
- Karie Nora as Grenadine
- Lori Wild as Regan
- Dean Vanderkolk as Witch Doctor
- Kristina Lakey as Lucy Furr
- Dave Ivey as Oscar The Ogre
- Mike Murphy as Son Of Froggy
- Rick Bobier as Scary Grant
- Wally Wojciechowski as Professor M Balmer
- Mike Shellabarger as Sheldon the Monster
- Jessica Humphrey as Ivana Werkagenn
- Sandra Kunz as Scarlett
- Shayna Shaw as Jan in the Pan

=== Host ===
Mac Kelly portrays the Wolfman Mac character, which had been a childhood dream of his. Kelly had watched horror hosts such as Count Scary, The Ghoul and Sir Graves Ghastly in his youth. Kelly, as Wolfman Mac, has performed marriage ceremonies and married couples at a haunted house on Halloween. Wolfman Mac has also been the grand marshal for halloween parades, including Armada-Geddon and hosted costume contests for the local city.

== Production ==
The production crew as well as the cast are amateurs who film the show at the Erebus haunted attraction in Pontiac, Michigan. Guests on the show include local personalities from WRIF and WCSX.

Horror artist, Steve Czapiewski was the lead editor and artist for the show. Steve also produced the show's animated introduction. Musician Mike Shellabarger produced the show's theme song for season 1 and 2.

Comic book artist, Tony Miello, provided artwork for the Chiller Drive-In comic book.

== Broadcast ==
The show was started by Mac Kelly in July 2007, as Wolfman Mac's Nightmare Sinema on the public access television station in Detroit, Michigan. Kelly had been a fan of Sir Graves Ghastly, a horror hosted television show in Detroit from 1967 through 1982.

In March 2008, the show was picked up by Detroit's MyNetworkTV affiliate, WMYD. At the same time, the show started airing in MyNetworkTV affiliates in Florida.

In November 2009, the show started being broadcast nationally when it was added to the programming schedule on the Retro Television Network.

Kelly announced in January 2013 that the program would cease creating new shows, though networks would still carry the program as reruns. The sets and props were sold at the Erebus haunted attraction in an everything-must-go sale in February 2013.

== Episodes ==
Wolfman Mac's Chiller Drive-In aired on multiple channels, most with a delayed or completely different schedule. This episode list details the programs as first aired during the show's run from public access to WMYD then to the Retro Television Network.

=== Nightmare SINema (2008) ===
Before the show was called Chiller Drive-In, it went by the name Wolfman Mac's Nightmare SINema. Some host segments and films from this season were revisited in the three seasons Chiller Drive-In.

No. overall	No. in season	Title	Movie	Original release date
1	1	"Robot Monster"	Robot Monster (1953)	July 19, 2008
2	2	"The Beach Girls and the Monster"	The Beach Girls and the Monster (1965)	July 26, 2008
3	3	"King Kong vs. Godzilla"	King Kong vs. Godzilla (1963)	August 2, 2008
4	4	"Spider Baby"	Spider Baby (1968)	August 9, 2008
5	5	"The Hideous Sun Demon"	The Hideous Sun Demon (1959)	August 16, 2008
6	6	"Santa Claus Conquers the Martians"	Santa Claus Conquers the Martians (1964)	August 23, 2008
7	7	"Killers from Space"	Killers from Space (1954)	September 20, 2008
8	8	"The Killer Shrews"	The Killer Shrews (1959)	September 27, 2008
9	9	"Horror Hotel"	Horror Hotel (1960)	October 4, 2008
10	10	"House on Haunted Hill"	House on Haunted Hill (1959)	October 11, 2008
11	11	"Mad Monster Party"	Mad Monster Party? (1967)	October 18, 2008
12	12	"The Last Man on Earth"	The Last Man on Earth (1964)	November 1, 2008
13	13	"Castle of Blood"	Castle of Blood (1964)	November 8, 2008
14	14	"Psychomania"	Psychomania (1973)	November 15, 2008
15	15	"Bride of the Monster"	Bride of the Monster (1955)	December 6, 2008
16	16	"Horror Express"	Horror Express (1972)	December 13, 2008
17	17	"Destroy All Planets"	Destroy All Planets (1968)	December 20, 2008
18	18	"The Amazing Transparent Man"	The Amazing Transparent Man (1960)	December 27, 2008
19	19	"The Little Shop of Horrors"	The Little Shop of Horrors (1960)	January 3, 2009
20	20	"The Brain That Wouldn't Die"	The Brain That Wouldn't Die (1962)	January 10, 2009
21	21	"The Day of the Triffids"	The Day of the Triffids (1962)	January 17, 2009
22	22	"Carnival of Souls"	Carnival of Souls (1962)	January 24, 2009
23	23	"The Crawling Eye"	The Crawling Eye (1956)	January 31, 2009
24	24	"Moon of the Wolf"	Moon of the Wolf (1972)	February 7, 2009
25	25	"Satan's School for Girls"	Satan's School for Girls (1973)	February 14, 2009
26	26	"Jesse James Meets Frankenstein's Daughter"	Jesse James Meets Frankenstein's Daughter (1966)	February 21, 2009
27	27	"The Devil's Messenger"	The Devil's Messenger (1959)	February 28, 2009
28	28	"Horror of the Zombies"	Horror of the Zombies (1974)	March 7, 2009

=== Season 1 (2009) ===
No. overall	No. in season	Title	Movie	Original release date
29	1	"Devil Doll"	Devil Doll (1964)	April 25, 2009
30	2	"Gorgo"	Gorgo (1961)	May 2, 2009
31	3	"King Kong Escapes"	King Kong Escapes (1967)	May 9, 2009
32	4	"Gammera the Invincible"	Gammera the Invincible (1965)	May 16, 2009
33	5	"Lost Continent"	Lost Continent (1951)	May 23, 2009
34	6	"Night of the Lepus"	Night of the Lepus (1972)	May 30, 2009
35	7	"The Bat"	The Bat (1959)	June 6, 2009
36	8	"I Bury the Living"	I Bury the Living (1958)	June 13, 2009
37	9	"The Wasp Woman"	The Wasp Woman (1959)	June 20, 2009
38	10	"il Evil Brain from Outer Space"	Evil Brain from Outer Space (1964)	June 27, 2009
39	11	"Horrors of Spider Island"	Horrors of Spider Island (1960)	July 4, 2009
40	12	"Sting of Death"	Sting of Death (1965)	July 11, 2009
41	13	"Werewolf in a Girls' Dormitory"	Werewolf in a Girls' Dormitory (1962)	July 18, 2009
42	14	"The She Beast"	The She Beast (1966)	July 25, 2009
43	15	"The Phantom Planet"	The Phantom Planet (1961)	August 1, 2009
44	16	"The Horror of Party Beach"	The Horror of Party Beach (1964)	August 8, 2009

=== Season 2 (2009–10) ===
No. overall	No. in season	Title	Movie	Original release date
45	1	"The Ghost"	The Ghost (1963)	September 19, 2009
46	2	"Zontar, The Thing from Venus"	Zontar, The Thing from Venus (1966)	September 26, 2009
47	3	"The Devil's Hand"	The Devil's Hand (1962)	October 3, 2009
48	4	"Attack of the Giant Leeches"	Attack of the Giant Leeches (1959)	October 10, 2009
49	5	"Tormented"	Tormented (1960)	October 17, 2009
50	6	"Nosferatu"	Nosferatu (1922)	October 24, 2009
51	7	"Night of the Living Dead"	Night of the Living Dead (1968)	October 31, 2009
52	8	"Dementia 13"	Dementia 13 (1963)	November 7, 2009
53	9	"Monster from a Prehistoric Planet"	Monster from a Prehistoric Planet (1967)	November 14, 2009
54	10	"The Monster Maker"	The Monster Maker (1944)	November 21, 2009
55	11	"Attack of the Eye Creatures"	Attack of the Eye Creatures (1965)	November 28, 2009
56	12	"The Giant Gila Monster"	The Giant Gila Monster (1959)	December 5, 2009
57	13	"The Screaming Skull"	The Screaming Skull (1958)	December 19, 2009
58	14	"The Legend of Bigfoot"	The Legend of Bigfoot (1976)	December 26, 2009
59	15	"Teenage Zombies"	Teenage Zombies (1959)	January 2, 2010

=== Season 3 (2010) ===
No. overall	No. in season	Title	Movie	Original release date
60	1	"Atom Age Vampire"	Atom Age Vampire (1963)	September 4, 2010
61	2	"Gamera vs. Barugon"	Gamera vs. Barugon (1966)	September 25, 2010
62	3	"Nightmare Castle"	Nightmare Castle (1965)	October 2, 2010
63	4	"Hercules Against The Moon Men"	Hercules Against The Moon Men (1964)	October 23, 2010
64	5	"White Zombie"	White Zombie (1932)	December 18, 2010

=== Special (2011) ===
Title	Movie	Original release date
"2011 Halloween Special"	Attack of the Monsters (1969)	October 29, 2011

== Reception ==
Wolfman Mac's Chiller Drive-In was voted as the Best Local TV Show Other Than a Newscast by readers of the Detroit Metro Times in an October 2008 poll. The Real Detroit Weekly named the show as the Best "Retro" Local TV Program in May 2009.

== Controversies ==
The show had run for the better part of a year on public access when it moved to WMYD in March 2008. The show was taken off the air after five episodes due to a legal dispute between Mac Kelly and Glenn Kirkland of Darkhaus Sound and Film, the production company for the series. The series returned to the air on May 17 of 2008 after Kelly started Mac Kelly Productions, LLC and removed all the elements that Darkhaus Sound and Film had provided for the show.
