= WJBK-TV Studios Building =

- U.S. National Register of Historic Places
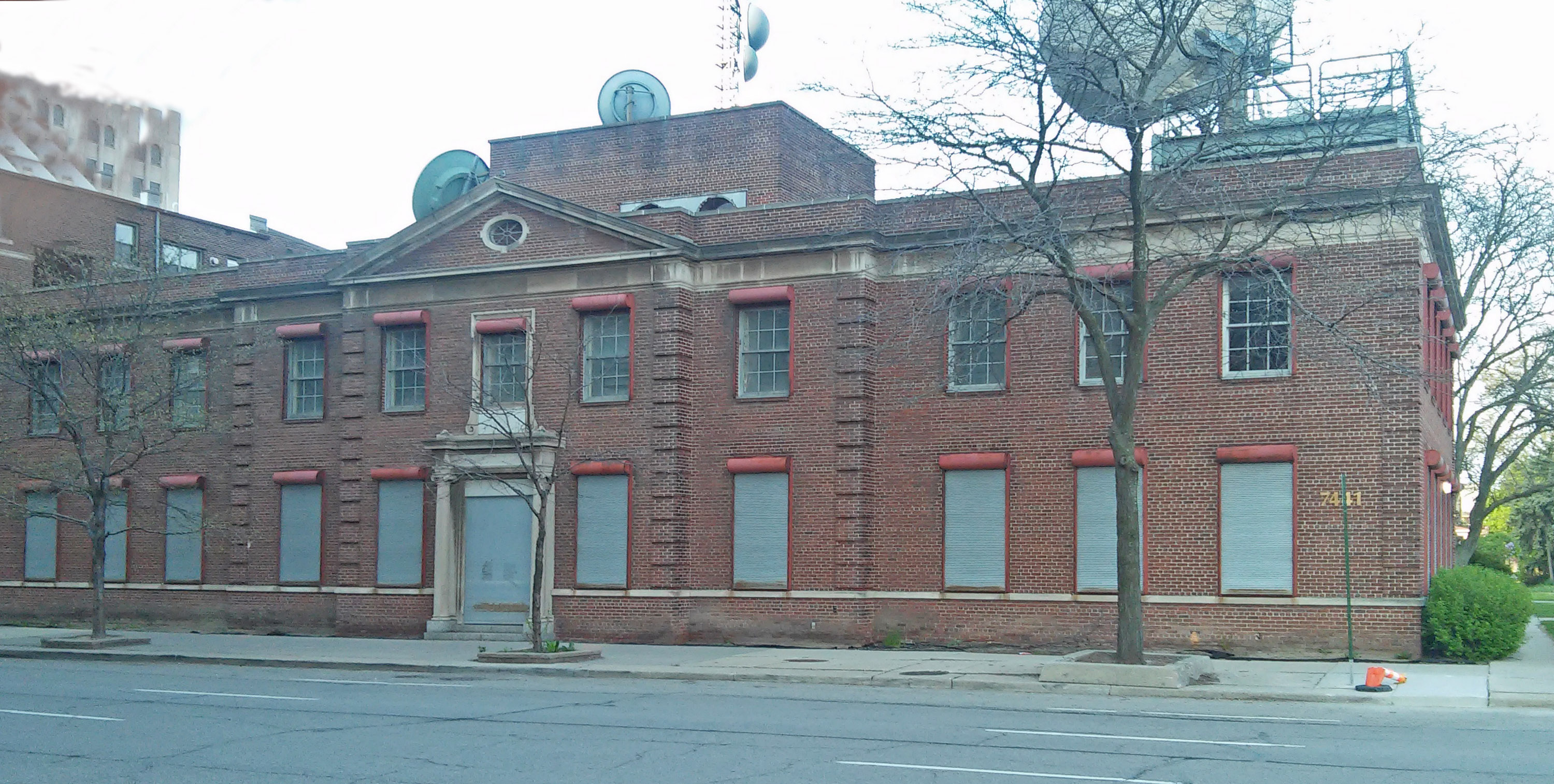

- Location within Michigan Location within the United States
- Interactive map
- Location: 7441 Second Ave. Detroit, Michigan
- Coordinates: 42°22′16″N 83°4′39″W
- Built: 1956
- Architect: John L. Volk
- Architectural style: Georgian Revival
- NRHP reference No.: 16000180
- Added to NRHP: April 19, 2016

The WJBK-TV Studios Building is a broadcasting building located at 7441 Second Avenue in Detroit, Michigan. It was listed on the National Register of Historic Places in 2016. It is the only building in Detroit designed by noted Palm Beach, Florida architect John L. Volk. The property is currently owned by Halcor Studio Live LLC.

== History ==
WJBK began as an AM radio station (now WLQV) in Detroit. In 1947 the station's television license was awarded by the Federal Communications Commission to George B. Storer's Fort Industry Broadcasting, the forerunner to Storer Communications. WJBK-TV began broadcasting on Channel 2 in Detroit on October 24, 1948 as a CBS affiliate. It was the third television station to go on the air in Detroit. The station began broadcasting from the Detroit Masonic Temple, but in 1956 Storer commissioned John L. Volk to design this studio. Storer and Volk were friends, and Storer had already commissioned a long string of works from Volk. The building was constructed that year, and WJBK moved its operations here.

Multiple shows were produced by Storer in the building, including its newscast, Sagebush Shorty, and Sir Graves Ghastly. However, by 1971, WJBK had outgrown the studio and operations were moved to a newer building on Nine Mile Road in Southfield. The Detroit building was sold to Detroit's public television station WTVS, Channel 56, for $750,000. WTVS used it until 2009, when they sold it to Mosaic Youth Theatre of Detroit. Mosaic used the building until 2014, when it was sold to a developer.

In 2022, the former WJBK-TV studios building was purchased, and donated to the nonprofit Midnight Golf Program to become their new headquarters. A $10–12 million reconstruction is planned.

== Description ==
The former WJBK-TV Studios Building is a two-story red brick Georgian Revival structure with limestone trim and brick quoins. The front facade has a projecting central section with a limestone-trimmed entry portico with flanked by Ionic columns. Equally spaced aluminum six-over-six double-hung windows run on either side of the entrance, and above on the second floor. Atop that is a tall frieze, classical cornice, and a limestone trimmed pediment with an oval window in the center. Many former Storer stations operated from studio facilities built in a similar style.

The interior of the building is divided into two sections: the office/administrative portion and the studio portion. The office portion contains a long rectangular entrance lobby and waiting room paneled with cypress wood, and a large two story open staircase, with curbed transition between rungs, in the center. The studio portion holds two studio spaces and a control room. The studio space was intended to be divided up, holding different sets in the studio at one time as needed.

== See also ==
- National Register of Historic Places listings in Detroit, Michigan
