= WRCJ-FM =

Classical/jazz radio station in Detroit

Detroit, Michigan; United States
- Broadcast area: Detroit–Windsor
- Frequency: 90.9 MHz (HD Radio)
- Branding: 90.9 WRCJ

Programming
- Format: Classical - Jazz

Ownership
- Owner: Stanley and Judith Frankel Family Foundation; (Detroit Classical and Jazz Educational Radio LLC)
- Operator: Detroit Public Media
- Sister stations: WTVS

History
- First air date: August 1948
- Former call signs: WDTR (1948–1982); WDTR-FM (1982–2004)
- Call sign meaning: "We Are Classical & Jazz"

Technical information
- Licensing authority: FCC
- Facility ID: 6056
- Class: B
- ERP: 22,500 watts
- HAAT: 216.4 meters (710 ft)
- Transmitter coordinates: 42°22′25″N 83°6′50″W

Links
- Public license information: Public file; LMS
- Webcast: Listen live
- Website: wrcjfm.org

WRCJ-FM (90.9 MHz) is a non-commercial radio station in Detroit, Michigan, broadcasting classical music and jazz. The license is held by the Detroit Classical and Jazz Educational Radio LLC, which is owned by the Stanley and Judith Frankel Family Foundation. The station is operated by Detroit Public Media, which owns PBS-member station WTVS (channel 56). It uses the slogan "Classical Days and Jazzy Nights." The studios are in the Detroit School of Arts and the offices are on Clover Court in Wixom, Michigan.

WRCJ has an effective radiated power (ERP) of 22,500 watts. It transmits from a tower at 710 feet (220 meters) height above average terrain (HAAT) near the corner of Eight Mile and Meyers roads in Oak Park, shared with other Detroit FM and TV stations, including WTVS, WMYD, and WWJ-TV.

== History ==
In August 1948, the station signed on as WDTR. It was owned by Detroit Public Schools and was Michigan's first educational FM station. WDTR offered classroom instruction and educational programs by day, with music shows in the evening. It transmitted a with an effective radiated power of 2,000 watts, and heard mostly in Detroit and its nearest suburbs.

By the early 2000s, the classroom instructional shows had ended. The station's programming consisted largely of urban contemporary music with public affairs programs concerning the school district and a variety of specialty shows. The schedule included the "Old 'n' Gold" rare oldies show, "Safe and Secure Detroit," a show dedicated to public safety and the Sunday big band/nostalgia showcase "Somewhere In Time".

WDTR changed its call sign to WRCJ on July 1, 2004, and the station cut back its broadcast time to 8 AM to 5 PM weekdays only. At the same time, the school district announced it would draft a contract with a third party to operate the station while it continued to own the frequency. Accordingly, the district put out an RFP (Request for Proposal), stipulating the station's format change to classical and jazz. Several area organizations responded, including Ann Arbor’s NPR member station WUOM and Detroit's PBS member station WTVS.

In April 2005, Detroit Public Schools announced that Detroit Public TV (WTVS 56) would take control of WRCJ by summer. The change happened at noon on August 1, 2005. On January 11, 2017, the Detroit Public Schools announced it would sell the station's license to the non-profit Detroit Classical and Jazz Educational Radio LLC, an entity owned by the Stanley and Judith Frankel Family Foundation. The price tag was $6 million. The deal received FCC approval on March 1 of that year.

== Airstaff ==
Regular program hosts include Dave Wagner, Peter Whorf, Haley Taylor, Christa Grix, Maxine Michaels, John Penney and Linda Yohn. Substitute and weekend hosts include Ron Nolan, Davis Gloff, Cecelia Sharpe, and Carl Grapentine, long time morning host at WFMT in Chicago.
