= Rob Wolchek =

American investigative reporter

- Occupation: Journalist

Rob Wolchek is a investigative reporter who worked for WJBK-TV Fox 2 News in Detroit, Michigan from 1997 to 2026. He is well known for his "Hall of Shame" segments.

== Career ==
Wolchek began his broadcasting career in 1978 as a DJ in Farmington, New Mexico at KRAZ, a country music station. He worked in radio as a disc jockey for many years before moving on to become news reporter for stations in Fresno and Bakersfield.

He got his first break in television covering the 1989 Loma Prieta earthquake in San Francisco. His first full-time television job was at KGET-TV in Bakersfield, California. He won awards for his role as the "Scambuster" at KJEO-TV (now KGPE) in Fresno, including his first Emmy. He is the winner of more than 25 regional Emmy awards.

Wolchek has been at WJBK television since 1997. He is known best known for his "Hall of Shame" segment and has exposed many scams and frauds. In 2005, he exposed a TV talent show producer that promised young models and actors prizes that didn't materialize. The producer fled Michigan after the story aired and soon surfaced in Cleveland running a similar scam. In 2013, Wolchek investigated Survivor star Michael Skupin for running what appeared to be a Ponzi scheme called Pay it Forward. In 2016, Skupin was convicted of Larceny by conversion and four counts of possession of Child Sexually Abusive Material when investigators found child pornography on his computer while investigating Pay it Forward. Skupin was sentenced to one to four years in state prison.

In December 2025, Wolchek announced his retirement to start in March of next year

== Chrysler Workers "Busted on the Job" story ==
In September 2010, Wolchek's "Busted on the Job" investigation made national and international news. The story exposed several Chrysler auto workers drinking and smoking what appeared to be marijuana during their lunch break and then heading back into Detroit's Jefferson North Assembly Plant. Chrysler acknowledged the validity of the story after viewing hidden camera video and fired 13 workers shortly after the story aired.

Wolchek was featured on several national news programs discussing the story, including Varney & Co., hosted by Stuart Varney on the Fox Business Network and America Live with Megyn Kelly on Fox News Channel. The story was also picked up by The Drudge Report, The Wall Street Journal, The Huffington Post, and ABC, MSNBC, CBS News, among others. Comedian Jay Leno used some of the story in his monologue on The Tonight Show with Jay Leno.

In July 2011, Wolchek again turned his cameras on slacking auto workers. This time, he confronted several caught drinking and smoking what appeared to be marijuana near Chrysler's Trenton Engine plant. Chrysler immediately suspended nine workers without pay.

Wolchek's report on Tower Defense and Aerospace made international news in November 2011. The investigation showed workers who build parts for armored vehicles like the Stryker for use in overseas military operations drinking and smoking marijuana near the plant then returning to work. The company suspended 17 workers identified in the investigative report.

== Personal life ==
Rob and his wife have two sons, Scott and Jack.. Scott is a reporter at Fox 2 in Detroit, along with Rob. Scott had a son, Rowan David Wolcheck, in March 2024, making Rob and his wife grandparents. Jack graduated from the Fire Academy in May 2024.
