= Woodrow the Woodsman =

American children's television character

Woodrow the Woodsman is a local children's television program host in Cleveland and Detroit from 1961 to 1972, and again in 1997 to 2000.

== History ==
Lead actor J. Clayton "Clay" Conroy (born 1918 in Jersey City, New Jersey) attended the Newark School of Fine and Industrial Arts, and later the New England Conservatory of Music, where his instrument was the trombone. He moved to Cleveland in 1959, and got his start as a supporting character on Linn Sheldon's "Barnaby" on KYW-TV. He branched off with his own show, "Woodrow," in 1961, and remained with Barnaby on Saturdays in "Barnwood Playhouse," moving to Detroit in 1966 shortly after the station was sold.

Conroy's show ran through 1972 (returning to Cleveland as "Hey Woody" that year), and was revived for three years starting in 1997 after a chance encounter between Conroy and a Canton television executive, David Little, who had loved the show as a child. Remarkably, Conroy still had all of his original props and costumes in his basement, including the puppets who were regular characters on the show: Tarkington Whom Owl, Voracious the Elephant, and Freddie the Alley-Croc. The puppet characters were voiced by fellow Cleveland actor Lawson J. Deming from 1961 to 1966, and Canton native Thomas E. Grove from 1997 to 2000. Deming went on to portray the popular horror movie host Sir Graves Ghastly for 15 years on Detroit television.
