= Randal J. Metz =

American puppeteer (born 1959)

Randal Metz
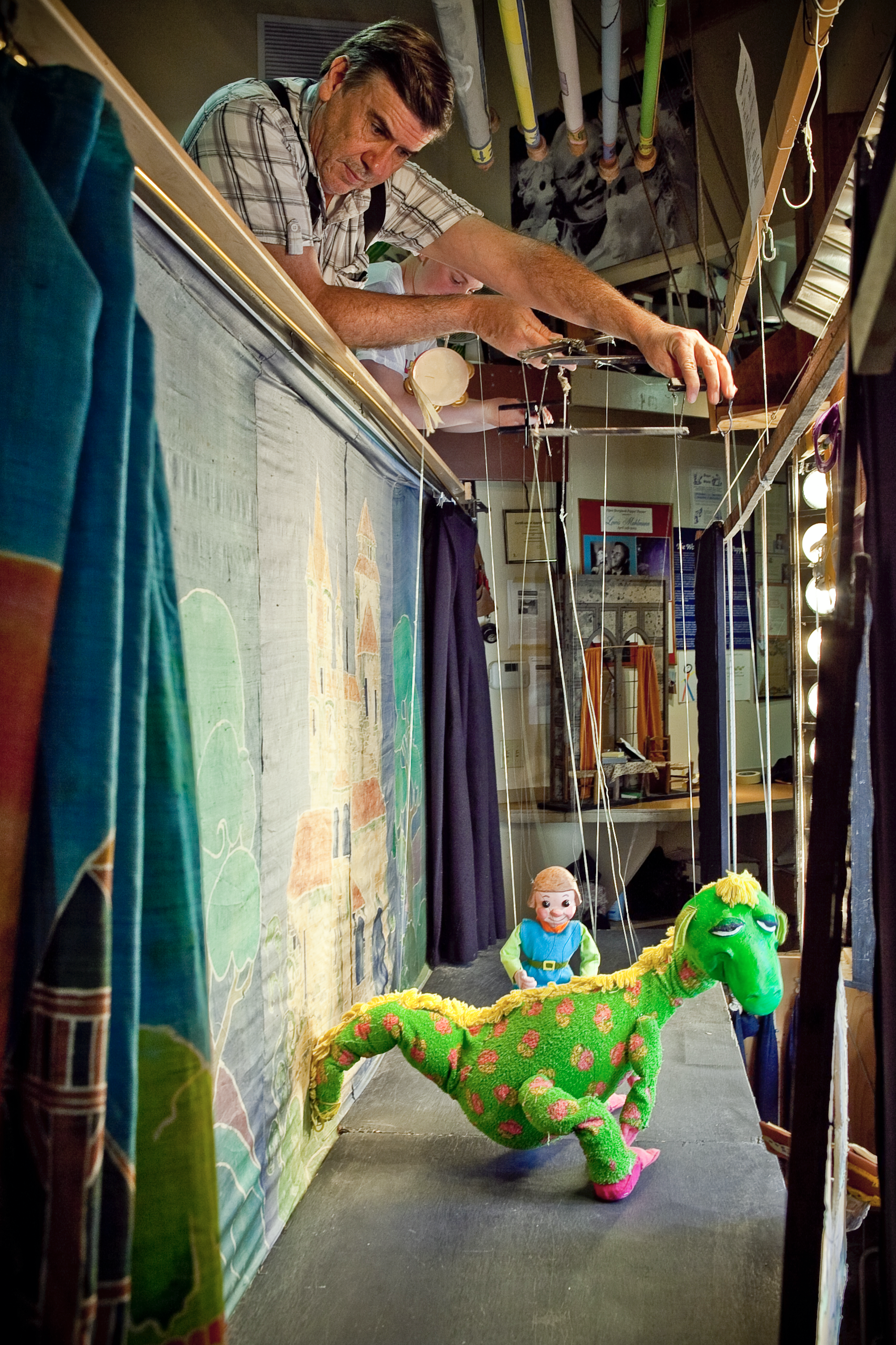
- Born: Randal John Metz; April 24, 1959 (age 67); Castro Valley, California, U.S.
- Education: Chabot College San Francisco State University
- Occupations: Puppeteer, Writer, Actor, Director
- Years active: 1970–
- Spouse: Dawn Graves (married 1989–1993)

Randal John Metz (born April 24, 1959) is a professional puppeteer and variety/stage performer. He is known for creating puppet productions, and puppet performer for Children's Fairyland's Open Storybook Puppet Theater in Oakland, California, the oldest continuously operating puppet theater in the United States. He currently produces seven different puppet shows a year for the theater, and tours his shows throughout California under the name The Puppet Company. He has served several terms as president and vice-president of the San Francisco Bay Area Puppeteers Guild.

== Early life ==
Metz was born in Castro Valley, California and grew up in Oakland and San Leandro, California. He chose puppetry as his career at age 10, when he visited Children's Fairyland in Oakland and saw Lewis Mahlmann's puppet production of Treasure Island, deciding immediately that he wanted to be a puppeteer.

His first contact with Children's Fairyland came as a child actor at the park. In the 1960s Fairyland had competitions for children for roles as Alice in Wonderland characters. Metz won the role of the Mad Hatter. After a year, he stayed on as a volunteer to be close to the puppet theater. He apprenticed to Mahlmann, along with John Gilkerson, Tom Royer, Paul Kennemore and Michael Earl Davis. Metz studied acting, directing and theater at Chabot College in Hayward, California and San Francisco State University in San Francisco, California, graduating Cum laude in 1985 with a BA in Theater Arts.

== Career ==
Metz trained professionally with Mahlmann from 1970 to 2014. In 1991 Metz and Mahlmann became M Plus M Productions, and co-directed the puppet theater until 2006 at which time Metz became the sole director.

Metz also studied puppetry with Lettie Connell Schubert who was known for her television puppet performances of the 1950s on the Brother Buzz show and Looking Glass Lady. He also attended personal classes taught by Jerry Juhl, the head writer for The Muppets.

From 1978 to 1980 Metz was trained by San Francisco Bay Area mime artist, Bari Rolfe, in the styles of masks and Commedia dell'arte.

In 1979 he joined with puppeteer Tom Royer to create The Puppet Company. The two performed from 1979 to 1980 at the Oakland Zoo (then known as Knowland Park Zoo). A special small amphitheater was constructed for their performances.

In 1985 he directed Oakland's Vagabond Puppets, a city-sponsored touring show. The program, created in 1948 has included as directors Lettie Connell Schubert, Bruce Chessé, Blake Maxam, Jerry Juhl and Frank Oz.

From 1986 to 1990, Metz studied with marionette artist Bob Baker, of The Bob Baker Marionette Theater in Los Angeles, California. Metz learned the art of creating and performing variety-show marionettes. 1987–1988, Metz was employed on two nationwide tours with The Big John Strong Circus, presenting large variety marionettes in a circus setting. In 1994 Metz was selected to participate in the Survey of Puppet Theater Techniques, taught by The Muppets performers, an intensive two week puppetry course.

Metz has trained five apprentices who have gone on to successful puppetry careers: Rhonda Godwin, his puppetry partner since 2000, Kevin Menegus, Jesse Vail, and Evy Wright and William Lewis.

When not working in the puppet world, Randal has acted with several Bay Area theaters, and has directed several plays. His company also teaches classes in puppetry and create puppet and prop rentals for stage musicals and dramas such as Little Shop of Horrors, Avenue Q, and Carnival!. He has performed as puppeteer with the San Francisco Chamber Orchestra and other musical associations.

In 2016, Metz received a Mayoral Proclamation from then city Mayor Libby Schaff honoring him for 47 years of artistic service to puppetry, Children's Fairyland, and the city of Oakland, by declaring August 27, 2016 "Randal Metz Day in Oakland."(12)

Metz has served at Fairyland as a child entertainer, ride operator, recreation specialist, event planner, children's theater director, artistic director (for 20 years), puppeteer and historian.(13)

During his career Metz has written and published six books: Two on the history of Children's Fairyland, three on the history and construction of puppets, and a history a puppetry in California.

== Personal life ==
In 1989 Randal married Dawn Graves, a long-time friend and fellow employee at Fairyland. They worked as a team in the circus and on the variety stage. After three years, they decided to separate and pursue different endeavors.

== Bibliography ==
- Metz, Randal (2003). Storybook Strings — 50 Years of Puppetry at Children’s Fairyland’s Storybook Puppet Theater. Oakland, California. Rappid Rabbit Publishing ISBN 0974714208
- Metz, Randal; Jonick, Tony (2011). Creating a Fairyland — 60 Years of Magic at Children’s Fairyland U.S.A. Oakland, California. Rappid Rabbit Publishing ISBN 9780974714219
- Metz, Randal (2012). Making Puppets The Fairyland Way. Vancouver, British Columbia. Charlemagne Press ISBN 978-0921845379
- Metz, Randal (2016). Children’s Fairyland (Images of America). Charleston, South Carolina. Arcadia Press ISBN 1467124168
- Metz, Randal; Menegus, Kevin (2020). A Century of California Puppetry or “How the West was Strung!”, Vancouver, British Columbia. Charlemagne Press ISBN 978-0921845539
- Metz, Randal (2021). Enchanted Strings: Bob Baker Marionette Theater. Los Angeles, California. Angel City Press ISBN 978-1626401075
