= Lee Thomas (reporter) =

American journalist

Lee Thomas (born September 15, 1967) is an author and an Emmy award winning entertainment reporter for WJBK Fox 2 News in Southfield, Michigan.

== Personal life ==
Thomas has vitiligo, a disease that causes the skin to lose its pigmentation.

== Education ==
Thomas obtained his Bachelor of Arts in Communication from George Mason University in Fairfax, Virginia.

== Career ==
Thomas travels the world as a motivational speaker and shares his story about his vitiligo. As a broadcaster, Thomas began his career working for "Channel One" News in New York City. Here he was responsible for covering the Oscars and the MTV Movie Awards. Soon after, he spent some time working for "Louisville Tonight Live." He was then hired by WABC 7 where he worked as the entertainment and feature reporter. After his time in New York City, he moved to Detroit to work at WJBK Fox 2 Detroit as a weekend anchor.

== Book ==
His book "Turning White" was taken from his personal journals and experiences from his vitiligo. Lee had various television appearances to discuss his book, Turning White. He appeared on The Hour with George Stroumboulopoulos, Larry King Live, and 20/20.

== Honors and awards ==
Thomas has won four Emmy Awards as an anchor and producer.
