= Lawson J. Deming =

American actor (1913–2007)

- Deming as "Sir Graves Ghastly"
- Born: 1913; Cleveland, Ohio, U.S.
- Died: 2007 (aged 93–94)
- Years active: Television: 1949–1982

Lawson J. Deming (April 23, 1913 – April 24, 2007) was a radio and TV character actor best known in Detroit, Toledo, Cleveland, Washington, D.C., and parts of Canada as the Saturday afternoon television horror movie host "Sir Graves Ghastly."

== Early years ==
Deming was born and grew up near Cleveland, OH. He attended Western Reserve University's Cleveland College, where he studied speech, dramatic arts and radio production. As part of a college radio play production class, he first appeared on the airwaves of WHK radio in the autumn of 1932. After college, Deming freelanced for a number of area stations and also landed an announcing job in West Palm Beach, FL before returning to his native Cleveland in the 1940s.

The new medium of television greatly interested Deming, and he broke in via Cleveland NBC affiliate KYW-TV as an afternoon movie host in 1949. The show, called One O'Clock Playhouse, ran until 1956. In the early 1960s, Lawson became a regular on the Cleveland children's show Woodrow the Woodsman, starring fellow Cleveland actor J. Clayton Conroy. Deming's face never appeared on the air, but he was the puppeteer and supplied multiple voices for the animal characters on the show. It was here that he finally got a chance on television to use his talents (honed on radio) for doing accents. It was stated that he could do 27 ethnic dialects.

== Sir Graves Ghastly ==
In 1965, KYW-TV was sold and the new ownership decided they did not want any locally produced children's shows. Woodrow the Woodsman eventually got picked up by WJBK, TV2 in Detroit, late in 1966. WJBK had lost their popular horror movie host "Morgus the Magnificent" (Sid Noel) a year earlier. Shortly after Woodrow began taping, TV2 approached Lawson about filling a Saturday afternoon horror movie slot, and Sir Graves Big Show (as it was originally called) was born.

Brainstorming with his long-time wife, Mary Rita, Deming eventually came up with a tongue-in-cheek vampire character "Sir Graves Ghastly" to be the lead on the show. The character was most widely recognized for his dark (and fake) mustache and goatee, plus a cackling, nasally laugh ("Nyaaa-aaaaaaah"). Sir Graves wasn't the only character on the show. Deming also developed a sidekick named Baruba (dressed in a monk's outfit and hood, so you couldn't see the face), who did his bidding. Perhaps the most beloved character was The Glob, whose face appeared (via early special effects) in the moon above the cemetery set. (The face was actually Sir Graves', upside-down, with eyes and nose painted on the chin.) The Glob's main role was to lip sync silly parody songs, such as "I Wanna Bite Your Hand" and "Ghoul Days."

Other characters included Reel McCoy (a diminutive caretaker who would dig up the movie reels at the beginning of the show), Tilly Trollhouse (a castle maid with a deep Bela Lugosi accent, played by Deming in drag) and Sir Graves' German-accented cousin, Baron Boogaloff. While billed as a kids' show, Deming's sly sense of humor often flew over the heads of children, which might explain why a TV2 ratings poll in 1971 showed that about one-third of his audience were adults.

Deming nearly became a corpse for real in 1970. Living in Cleveland, he would regularly take a TAG Airlines plane to Detroit to tape his show in the Motor City. On January 28, 1970, Deming narrowly missed his flight; the plane crashed, killing all nine people aboard. Deming took the bus after that, enduring six-hour round-trip rides.

In all, Sir Graves Ghastly ran for fifteen seasons in Detroit. Due to the show's popularity (it was topping all other programs in its time slot other than live sporting events), WJBK added the occasional after-school or prime time Sir Graves special and, of course, several Halloween specials. The explosion of televised sports in the early 1980s, particularly college football, caused Sir Graves to go into hiatus after the November 6, 1982, program (featuring the film Corridors of Blood). A management change during this time led to the program being "officially" cancelled in 1983 before any other shows were produced. As he did while his show was running, Deming continued to do speaking engagements and personal appearances well into the 1990s.

In the 1970s, Deming marketed the Sir Graves character to Cleveland and Washington, D.C., where it also became a big hit. But his popularity in those markets never quite reached that of the Detroit audience (and many in neighboring Canada that could pick up the WJBK signal), where his "evil" laugh and catch phrases like "Happy Haunting" are remembered by an entire generation of both kids and adults.

Lawson Deming died on April 24, 2007, at the age of 94.

== Awards and recognition ==
- 1998 "Silver Circle" inductee, National Academy of Television Arts and Sciences (NATAS)
