= Children's Fairyland =

Amusement park in Oakland, California

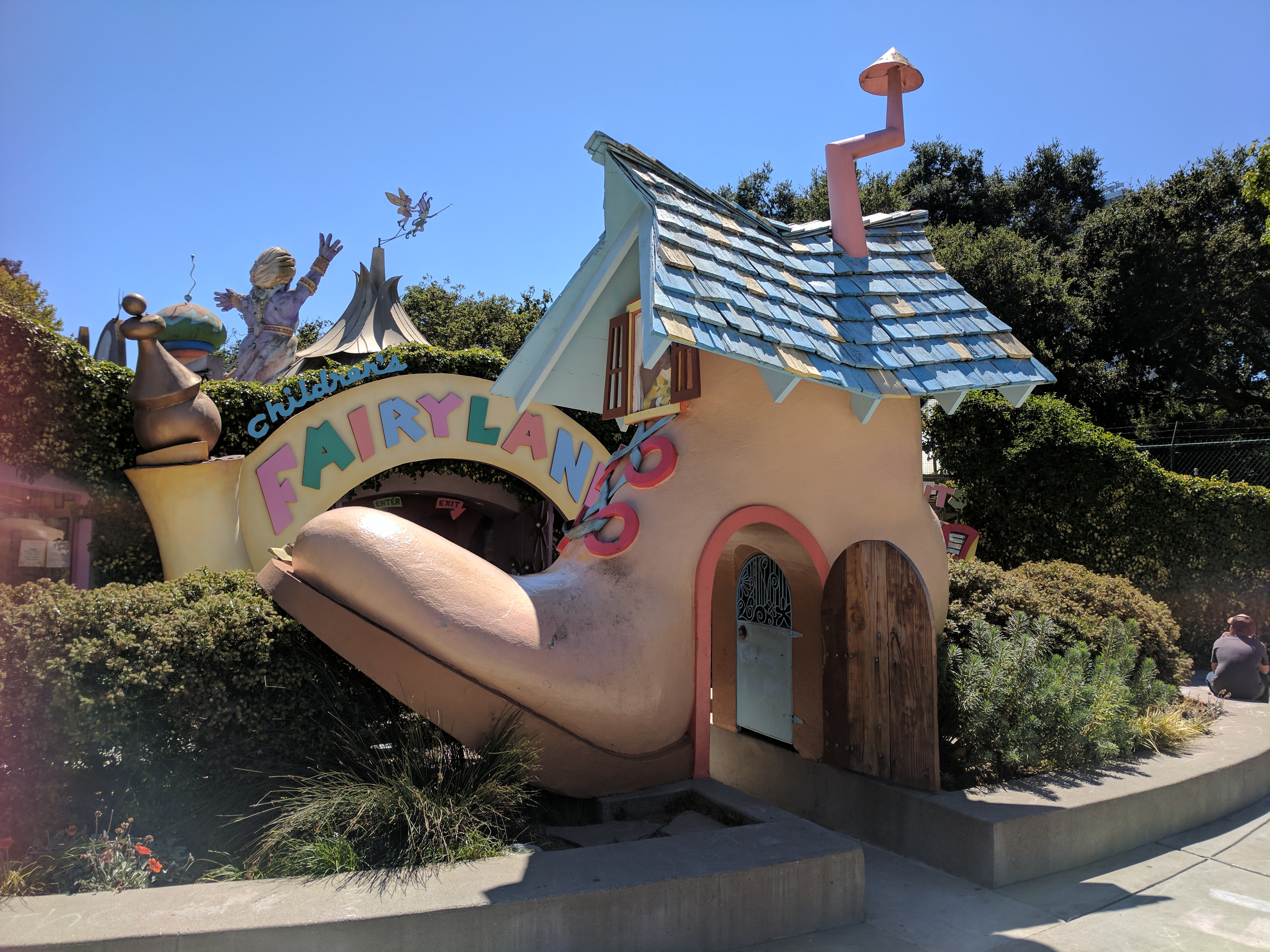
- Entrance to Children's Fairyland
- Interactive map of Children's Fairyland
- Location: 699 Bellevue Ave., Lake Merritt, Oakland, California 94610
- Coordinates: 37°48′32″N 122°15′36″W
- Opened: September 2, 1950
- Owner: City of Oakland Park and Recreation Department
- Operated by: Oakland Children's Fairyland, Inc.
- Theme: Fairy tales
- Area: 10 acres (4.0 ha)

Children's Fairyland, U.S.A. is an amusement park, located in Oakland, California, on the shores of Lake Merritt. It was one of the earliest "themed" amusement parks in the United States. Fairyland includes 10 acres (4.0 ha) of play sets, small rides, and animals. The park is also home to the Open Storybook Puppet Theater, the oldest continuously operating puppet theater in the United States (71 years as of September 2026).

Fairyland was built in 1950 by the Oakland Lake Merritt Breakfast Club, a local service club. The park was immediately recognized nationally for its unique value, and during the 1950s it inspired numerous towns to create their own parks. Walt Disney toured many amusement parks in 1950, including Children’s Fairyland, seeking ideas for what turned out to be Disneyland. He hired the first director of Fairyland, Dorothy Manes, to work at Disneyland as youth director, in which position she continued from the park's opening until 1972.

Numerous artists have contributed exhibits, murals, puppetry, and sculptures to the park. Some of the better-known artists are Ruth Asawa and Frank Oz, who was an apprentice puppeteer in the park as a teenager.

== Origins of the park ==
On a 1947 trip to the Detroit children's zoo in Belle Isle Park, Oakland nurseryman Arthur Navlet saw a collection of small nursery-rhyme themed buildings, and wanted to create something similar in Oakland's Lake Merritt Park. His hope was to create much larger sets that children could climb in and interact with. After getting the backing of the Lake Merritt Breakfast Club, a civic organization devoted to improving the park, he took his ideas to William Penn Mott Jr., then director of Oakland's parks department. Mott and the Breakfast Club were able to raise $50,000 from Oakland citizens. Contributing sponsors included Earl Warren, Clifford E. Rishell, Joseph R. Knowland and Thomas E. Caldecott.

Navlet hired fantasy artist and architect William Russell Everritt (1904–1978) to design the original 17 sets. Everritt originally presented models which followed a standard fantasy architecture: straight-sided, "precious" buildings in gingerbread and candy. When told his models were too staid, he delightedly destroyed them and came back with buildings with no straight sides and outré colors and textures. It was exactly what Navlet was looking for.

== The original park ==
The park opened on September 2, 1950. Admission was 9 to 14 cents, depending on age. The original guides to the park were a dwarfish married couple (Victor Wetter and Edna Wetter) dressed in glamorous Munchkin-style costumes. The park was reported on nationally, with numerous newsreels shot in the park. The original sets included Pinocchio's Castle, Thumbelina, Three Billy Goats Gruff, The Merry Miller, The Three Little Pigs, Willie the Whale, and several others. The entrance to the park was through the shoe illustrating the Old Woman in the Shoe. The entrance through the shoe was sized for children, so that adults had to bend over to go through. The park thrived, and in 1956, the City of Oakland Parks and Recreation Department hired Burton Weber to promote the wonders inside Fairyland’s gates. Weber created a program for young children called Fairyland Personalities, which is still part of Fairyland's Children’s Theater program.

Fairyland is also home to the original "Magic Key" and Talking Storybook Boxes. Oakland television personality Bruce Sedley would often make appearances at the park to tell the stories of the sets. The constant strain of speaking threatened his voice, and he invented a system of talking books with recorded stories on tape. The boxes were activated by a plastic key. Sedley took the system he developed at Fairyland to zoos and children's parks across the country, where they are still used extensively. The Magic Key system is still in effect at Fairyland.

== Puppet theater ==
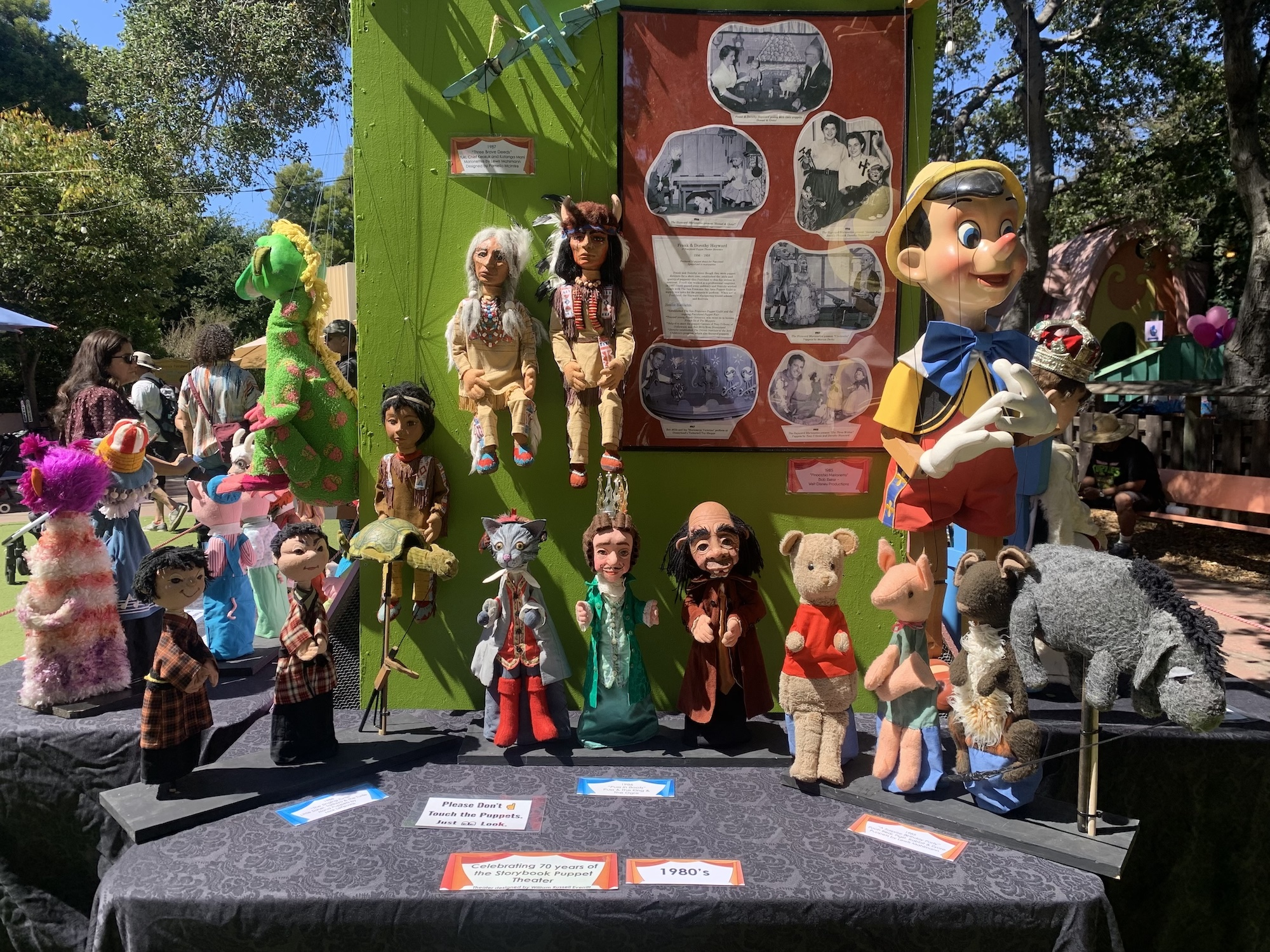
Display of historic Fairyland puppets from the 1980s

Fairyland’s Storybook Puppet Theater, which opened in 1956, is the oldest continuously operating puppet theater in the United States. The theater presents three performances a day, year round, from a repertoire of more than 150 puppet shows. Most of the shows are based on classic fairytales and folk tales from around the world, including The Three Little Pigs, Pinocchio, and The Pied Piper. All of the puppets – including bunraku, shadow puppets, hand puppets, rod puppets, and marionettes – are constructed at the theater by the puppet director and apprentices.

The theater structure was designed by the park’s original architect, William Russell Everitt, with the assistance of members of the San Francisco Bay Area Puppeteers Guild. It accommodated hand and rod puppets. For the theater’s 50th anniversary, in 2006, the building was redesigned with a storage area, workshop, and higher ceiling for dramatic effects.

Many accomplished puppeteers have worked at Fairyland’s puppet theater, including Tony Urbano, Luman Coad, and Frances and Isadore ("Mike") Oznowicz. The Oznowiczes’ son, Frank, performed at the theater when he was a teenager; he later shortened his name to Frank Oz and went on to perform with The Muppets and to direct many Hollywood films. Muppet performer Alice Dinnean also got her start at Fairyland's puppet theater. Lewis Mahlmann, who served as the puppet theater’s director from 1967 to 2005, authored four books about puppetry, and twice served as president of the Puppeteers of America.

The current theater director is Randal J. Metz, who apprenticed with Mahlmann while he was still in grade school. Metz shared the director’s job with Mahlmann beginning in 1991, and became sole director upon Mahlmann’s retirement in 2005.

== The park today ==
The park continued to grow through the early years, adding the Open Storybook Puppet Theater, also designed by Everritt, in 1956, as well as other sets. In 1994, with help from the Lake Merritt Breakfast Club, Fairyland applied for and received 501(c) (3) nonprofit status to allow it to apply for grants, receive bond funds, and solicit donations.

In 2006, the Storybook Puppet Theater celebrated its 50th anniversary with a near-complete renovation including the addition of a new facade and workshop. The current master puppeteer is Randal Metz.

In addition to exhibits, the park today has rides such as the spiderweb Ferris wheel (Anansi’s Magic Web) , a carousel (Flecto Carousel), an Alice in Wonderland themed merry-go-round (Wonder-Go-Round) and the Jolly Trolly (a train). For safety reasons, Fairyland admits adults only when they’re accompanied by children and children only when they’re accompanied by adults.

== Aesop's Playhouse ==
Performance by puppeteer from the Bob Baker Marionette Theater in the Aesop's Playhouse in 2026

In 2008, Fairyland opened Aesop's Playhouse, a dedicated children's theater funded by Oakland City bond measure DD. It is a Greek theater-style outdoor amphitheater seating 215 people. Fairyland had a long tradition of plays put on by local children ages 8–10, but they were performed on the smaller Emerald City Stage. Previous plays have included The Monkey King's Journey to the West, Brer Rabbit, The Wizard of Oz, Cuoi, the Boy in the Moon, Little Red Riding Hood, Lost in Fairyland, Hip-Hop Pinocchio, The Panchatantra, Méxica, Aesop's Fables, The Girl Who Lost Her Smile, Harvest at the Lake, Click, Clack, Moo: Cows That Type, The Cat in the Hat, and Five Little Monkeys.

== Bibliography ==
Storybook Strings: 50 Years of Puppetry at Children's Fairyland's Storybook Puppet Theater, by Tony Jonick, 2003
