= Ghastly =

Ghastly may refer to:

- "Ghastly" Graham Ingels (1915–1991), American illustrator
- Ghastly (DJ) (born 1989), American DJ
- Ghastly (film), a 2011 South Korean film
- Sir Graves Ghastly, a character created by Lawson J. Deming
- Major Dr. Ghastly, a character in Evil Con Carne

== See also ==
- Ghastly Ones, an American band
- Blood Rites (film) (original title: The Ghastly Ones), a 1968 American film
- Gastly, a Pokémon
