= Linn Sheldon =

American children's TV host (1919–2006)

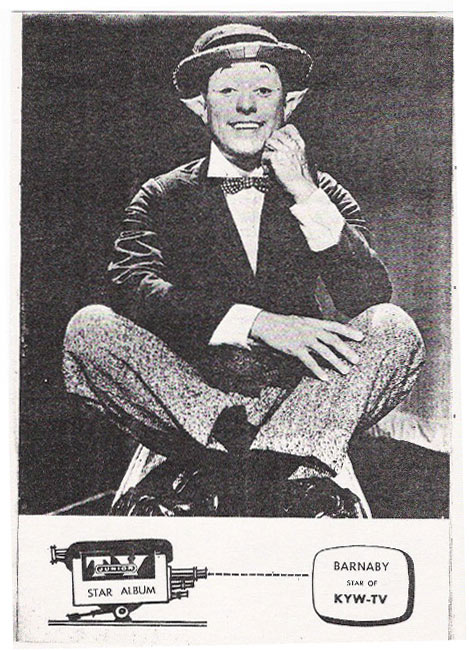
- Born: Linn Richard Sheldon; September 20, 1919; Norwalk, Ohio
- Died: April 23, 2006 (aged 86); Lakewood, Ohio
- Occupation: Local children's TV host

Linn Sheldon (September 20, 1919 – April 23, 2006) was a Cleveland, Ohio-based American children's television host and actor, best known for his character "Barnaby," which was seen in Cleveland for over 30 years.

== Early life ==
Linn Richard Sheldon was born in Norwalk, Ohio. He spent the majority of his childhood either homeless or in foster care.

== Career ==
He served in the U.S. Army during World War II, returning to his hometown and working as a nightclub act, later starting on Cleveland, Ohio television in 1948. He became a well-known local radio and television personality in the Cleveland market, especially as the host of the children's show Barnaby.

=== Barnaby ===
The character "Barnaby" was originally an elf with pointy ears, with a straw hat who lived in the "Enchanted Forest" and showed cartoons (mostly "Popeye") to his audience of adults and children alike. He eventually became popular enough that his show was aired seven days a week (a supporting character on the show - "Woodrow the Woodsman" - became popular in his own right and was spun off into his own series).

"Barnaby" aired on Cleveland NBC affiliate KYW (now WKYC) channel 3 from 1957 to 1967. Sheldon would then reprise the character on then upstart independent Cleveland station WUAB channel 43 (which is now Cleveland's My Network TV affiliate).

"Barnaby" aired on channel 43 from 1969 until 1990. The character was modified a bit in this new incarnation. He went from being an elf to more of a kindly older gentleman, who wore his trademark straw hat, an ascot, a blue blazer, and khaki slacks. The program also switched from taking place in the "Enchanted Forest" to Barnaby's cottage (and towards the end, "Barnaby Park", which resembled a typical suburban park complete with park benches).

"Casper the Friendly Ghost" cartoons became a fixture during Barnaby's WUAB tenure, as well as puppet characters such as:

- "Long John" - the world's only invisible parrot (an empty birdcage which Sheldon supplied a voice for)
- "Clyde" - a little fellow who idolized Barnaby and wore a straw hat and sunglasses
- "O.T. the Other Terrestrial" - an alien character that was created in the early '80s due to the popularity of the film E.T. the Extra-Terrestrial
- "Ranger Rupert" - a dog puppet who was the park ranger at Barnaby Park.

The theme music for "Barnaby" was "A La Claire Fontaine," an arrangement by Robert Farnon of an old French lullaby.

Sheldon would famously end the show with: "If anybody calls, tell them Barnaby said hello. And tell them that I think you are the nicest person in the whole world... Just you." As a result, the character is remembered for the catchphrase "Tell them Barnaby said Hello."

During his entire time as "Barnaby," Sheldon would frequently make personal appearances, especially in hospitals, to entertain and cheer up sick children.

Sheldon ended his run as "Barnaby" in 1990 and went into retirement.

=== Other work ===
During the '70s and into the early 1980s, Sheldon (while also doing Barnaby) co-hosted a daily morning talk show, 43 A.M., which was WUAB's version of the popular Morning Exchange airing on rival WEWS (Cleveland's ABC affiliate).

== Awards and honors ==
- 1992 Silver Circle Award, presented by Lower Great Lakes Chapter - National Academy of Television Arts & Science
- 1997 inductee - Cleveland Association of Broadcasters Hall of Fame

== Personal life ==
Sheldon made headlines in 1975 when he sought treatment for alcoholism.

He released his memoir Barnaby and Me in 2003 and died in Lakewood, Ohio on April 23, 2006.
