= The Legend of Bigfoot =

1976 American film by Harry Winer

- Directed by: Harry Winer
- Written by: Paula Labrot; Harry Winer
- Produced by: Stephen Houston Smith
- Starring: Ivan Marx; Peggy Marx
- Narrated by: Ivan Marx
- Cinematography: Ivan Marx; Peggy Marx
- Edited by: Paula Labrot
- Music by: Don Peake
- Production company: Palladium Productions
- Distributed by: Filmcentralen Palladium
- Release date: January 1, 1976 (USA)
- Running time: 76 minutes; 92 minutes (American DVD)
- Country: United States
- Language: English

The Legend of Bigfoot is a 1976 American pseudo-documentary film that explores the myth and alleged sightings of Bigfoot, a cryptid said to inhabit the forests of North America. Directed by Harry Winer and co-written by Winer and Paula Labrot, the film presents a mixture of staged footage and purported real encounters, narrated by Ivan Marx, who also appears on screen alongside his wife, Peggy Marx.

== Plot ==
Animal tracker Ivan Marx opens by mentioning the film is the culmination of 10 years of research. He says that the Eskimos called the creature "bushman," the Colville Indians "Sasquatch," and the Hoopa "Om-mah," but is most commonly known as Bigfoot.

Marx's brother-in-law takes him to the land of petrified wood, showing him rock carvings of creatures with big hands and feet. The carvings tell the story of the creature stealing children, causing a village to be abandoned.

Marx finds large tracks in the snow and later a dead bear with similar tracks nearby. He finds strange hair between the bear's teeth and sets out to track the creature. He finds tracks in the mud beside a river and something moving nearby. He intends to inform others but rain washes the tracks away.

Marx investigates tracks in several states only to find they're not bigfoot tracks. He visits the Oh-mah bigfoot redwood statue in northern California and the Oregon coast, continuing to search.

Marx takes a job in Washington state to film a Cinnamon bear. While there, he films Bigfoot walking through a field. He mentions that his footage of Bigfoot has been questioned by science and used by others on lecture circuits to make money.

Marx shows footage of an injured squirrel, goats eating dirt, and glaciers melting. He mentions the Trans-Alaska Pipeline and visits Yukon Frida, who paints pictures of Bigfoot.

Marx travels above the Arctic Circle, showing footage of the Northern lights while relating Bigfoot tales. He visits an Eskimo who promises he'll see Bigfoot. Later in the evening, he films what he describes "the shining eyes" of the creature, but when dawn comes, he says Bigfoot disappeared behind a rainbow.

Marx shows footage of salmon spawning, geese migrating, caribou, and Alaska moose defending their territory. He searches from a plane and films a young Bigfoot near a river. He lands, but Bigfoot runs away.

He films hunters with their kills and beavers gathering wood for their dams. He then shows footage of Bigfoot at another river and a second Bigfoot close by, mentioning a related strong musky odor. Bigfoot is shown eating grass and Marx mentions he must be a vegetarian.

Marx ends the film by saying he has determined Bigfoot's migratory and eating habits and that he'll continue his search to document more of Bigfoot's behaviors.

== Cast ==
- Ivan Marx as himself
- Peggy Marx as herself

== Themes ==
It has been claimed that Ivan Marx was the first to find handprints of Bigfoot. Much of the film is wildlife and nature footage.

== Production ==
The film was created by Ivan Marx, the majority of which he filmed himself. Marx did the narration for the film himself and also served as the executive producer.

== Release ==
The Legend of Bigfoot was released to theaters in 1976. Ivan Marx made two follow-up documentaries: In the Shadow of Bigfoot and Bigfoot: Alive and Well in '82.

=== Home media ===
The Legend of Bigfoot was released to the home video market on VHS tape by World Premiere Home Video in 1985. In 2009, the film was released on DVD, along with Snowbeast, by Alpha Video.

== Reception ==
Like Marx himself, his film polarized critics, audiences and Bigfoot hunters alike. Praise focused largely on the nature footage and the new information about cryptozoology, but criticism largely focused on Marx's rambling voice-overs (seen by some as self-promotion) and the poor-quality Bigfoot footage, that most have accepted as a hoax. However, to this day, there are many supporters of Marx, who consider him a true explorer and pioneer in the field of cryptozoology.

== Soundtrack ==
Don Peake composed the music for the film.

== See also ==
- Peter C. Byrne
