= WMYD =

Television station in Detroit

ATSC 3.0 station
- Detroit, Michigan; United States
- Channels: Digital: 31 (UHF); Virtual: 20
- Branding: The Spot – Detroit 20; 7 News Detroit

Programming
- Affiliations: 20.1: Independent; for others, see § Subchannels

Ownership
- Owner: E. W. Scripps Company; (Scripps Broadcasting Holdings LLC)
- Sister stations: WXYZ-TV

History
- First air date: September 15, 1968
- Former call signs: WXON (1968–1997); WDWB (1997–2006)
- Former channel numbers: Analog: 62 (UHF, 1968–1972), 20 (UHF, 1972–2009); Digital: 21 (UHF, 2002–2019)
- Former affiliations: Independent (1968–1995, 2021–2023); ON TV (1979–1983); The WB (1995–2006); FoxBox/4KidsTV (secondary, 2003-2008); MyNetworkTV (2006–2021); The CW (2023–2024)
- Call sign meaning: "MyNetworkTV Detroit" (former affiliation)

Technical information
- Licensing authority: FCC
- Facility ID: 74211
- ERP: 935 kW
- HAAT: 324 m (1,063 ft)
- Transmitter coordinates: 42°26′52.5″N 83°10′23.1″W

Links
- Public license information: Public file; LMS
- Website: www.thespottv.com/detroit-20

WMYD (channel 20), branded as The Spot – Detroit 20, is an independent television station in Detroit, Michigan, United States. It is owned by the E. W. Scripps Company alongside ABC affiliate WXYZ-TV (channel 7). The two stations share studios at the Broadcast House on 10 Mile Road in Southfield; WMYD's transmitter is located on Eight Mile Road in Oak Park.

Founded in 1968 as WXON on channel 62 and relocated to channel 20 in 1972, the station was an independent focusing primarily on syndicated programs and classic reruns. It made an ill-fated foray into subscription television (STV) from 1979 to 1983, broadcasting a pay service under the ON TV brand that was dogged by a poor relationship with the station and signal piracy issues exacerbated by Detroit's proximity to Canada. After it folded, WXON continued as an independent station and emerged as the second-rated independent in its market, affiliating with The WB in 1995.

Granite Broadcasting purchased WXON in 1997 and renamed it WDWB. However, its high debt load motivated several attempts to sell the station, one of which fell apart after The WB merged with UPN to form The CW but did not include WDWB as an affiliate. The station then became WMYD, aligned with MyNetworkTV and airing its programming for 15 years. In 2014, Scripps purchased WMYD and added local newscasts from the WXYZ-TV newsroom. As Detroit's ATSC 3.0 (NextGen TV) station, WMYD is used in automotive-related tests of the transmission technology. It was Detroit's affiliate for The CW from 2023 to 2024 and in 2026 became the primary broadcaster of Detroit Pistons basketball.

== History ==
=== The channel 62 years ===
At the end of January 1965, Aben Johnson, majority owner of a chemical manufacturing company and with several real estate holdings, filed with the Federal Communications Commission (FCC) to build a television station on channel 44 in Pontiac, in Oakland County. After an overhaul of the FCC's UHF table of allocations, Johnson amended his application to specify channel 62 in Detroit. A construction permit for the station was issued on October 7, 1965, and assigned the call sign WXON that December. Johnson also held construction permits for stations in Hammond, Indiana, and Akron, Ohio, which he called the Action Network and proposed to focus on programming for teen audiences. He considered a Detroit radio station as well before learning how saturated the market was.

After three years, WXON began broadcasting on September 15, 1968. While it had originally proposed to broadcast from Southfield, where a new UHF transmission facility was being built for WKBD-TV (channel 50) and three other stations, Johnson bowed out and built his own transmitter facility and studio at 14 Mile and Decker roads in Walled Lake. Syndicated reruns and movies were joined by Rae Dean and Friends, a series of children's puppets conducted by Frank Deal and previously seen on WJRT-TV in Flint. The small facility, with its lower costs of operation, also produced commercials seen on other local TV stations; a revival of Robin Seymour's Swingin' Time, a dance show that had been canceled by CKLW-TV in Windsor, Ontario; and a syndicated wrestling program, Big Time Wrestling. However, the station's signal coverage of Detroit itself proved poorer than expected.

=== Move to channel 20 ===
In an unusual circumstance, a full transmitter facility for channel 20 at Southfield had been built, but the station slated to use it had failed to start. In 1964, United Broadcasting Company had purchased the construction permit for WJMY, which had briefly broadcast from Allen Park from 1962 to 1963 but was no longer on the air. United proposed to return it to the air with a focus on specialty ethnic programs from the new Southfield UHF mast, but planned dates came and went without any activity, including an announced May 1969 groundbreaking on studios.

However, United faced increasing legal scrutiny that primarily centered around issues at its radio and television stations in Washington, D.C., WOOK and WFAN-TV, and extended to several other properties. After a sale of WJMY to United Artists fell through, in December 1970, United filed to sell the construction permit for WJMY to WXON—which had reportedly lost $136,000 in its first two years of operation because of the deficient signal in the full market—with the purpose of moving WXON to channel 20. Land mobile radio users protested the proposal, asking for the fallow channel 20 to be turned over for their use, but the FCC approved the deal in June 1972, finding that United's inability to utilize the improved WJMY-TV facility was due to its own financial troubles. Johnson announced the station would relocate its studios from Walled Lake and floated the possibility of changing the call sign.

In November 1972, WXON went off channel 62 and remained off the air for a month to effectuate the change to channel 20. Broadcasting resumed on channel 20 on December 9. Several new shows were added with the channel change, including The 700 Club. In 1975, the city of license for the station was changed from Allen Park to Detroit, and the studios were moved to the transmitter site in Southfield.

Through the 1970s, WXON primarily focused on syndicated output. It did, however, bring late-night horror movie cult favorite The Ghoul Show back to Detroit television after WKBD had canceled his show in 1976; The Ghoul would air in two stints on the station, from 1977 to 1979 and again for several years in the early 1980s. Though Gordon Castelnero, who wrote a 2006 book on local TV programming in Detroit, characterized WXON as producing "virtually no local programming to speak of" outside The Ghoul during the 1970s, there were other shows. Twice during the decade, it aired a television version of the long-running Middle East Melodies radio show, which featured guests as well as belly dancers.

=== Subscription television ===
As early as 1970, WXON eyed the possibility of broadcasting scrambled subscription television (STV) programming to paying subscribers, filing one of the first applications for such a service at the FCC. The FCC approved this application in 1977, and the same year, WXON struck an agreement with National Subscription Television, owner of the ON TV service that started in Los Angeles that year, to provide STV programs to air on the station. Under a 1978 agreement between Oak Industries and Chartwell Communications—the two partners in National Subscription Television—Chartwell was given the Detroit market to develop. The two parties successfully aimed for a July 1, 1979, launch. Unlike in other markets, Chartwell selected equipment from Oak's rival, Blonder-Tongue. This decision drew Oak's ire when Chartwell ordered more Blonder-Tongue equipment in 1981, part of a falling-out that saw Oak buy out Chartwell's stake in the successful ON TV system in Los Angeles.

The ON TV service in Detroit quickly gained 15,000 subscribers within three months and snared the rights to Detroit Red Wings hockey, Detroit Tigers baseball (consisting of 20 weeknight games a year from Tiger Stadium), and Michigan Wolverines athletics (including tape-delayed football games). In the case of the Wolverines, it even ran one experimental 1979 telecast live, a presentation spearheaded by Michigan athletic director Don Canham with the blessing of the NCAA.

However, ON TV in Detroit was challenged on several fronts, one of which had an outsize impact: the manufacture of pirate decoder boxes to receive the ON TV signal without being an actual subscriber. This issue was particularly pronounced in Detroit because ON TV could not legally sell its service across the Detroit River in Windsor, Ontario, Canada. The Canadian Radio-television and Telecommunications Commission's then-ongoing study of pay television services prompted ON TV to halt any plans to start its own business operations there; when asked about the possibility of ON TV being legal in Canada, Minister of Communications David MacDonald replied that the idea "would appear to fly in the face of every statement that's ever been made about Canadian broadcasting". Consequently, a cottage industry of illegal decoder box manufacturing arose in Windsor. This activity was unregulated in Canada, but as Americans began to purchase the Canadian decoders and use them in the United States, they posed a serious legal threat to the viability of Chartwell's subscription operation. In late May 1981, the company stationed process servers outside of the Windsor offices of one decoder manufacturer, Video Gallery, to dissuade potential U.S. buyers. Chartwell then successfully took Video Gallery and its American clients to U.S. federal court, seeking and obtaining an injunction to prevent Americans from importing its products. In response, Video Gallery obtained an injunction in an Ontario court preventing ON TV representatives from interfering with customers entering its store.

The U.S. government closed the border to Canadian decoders in August. Video Gallery closed at the end of the year, and Chartwell won a $618,000 judgment against it in March 1982. Even then, it was estimated that some 10,000 additional households received ON TV in southwestern Ontario, including on master antenna systems in apartment complexes—none of them making money for Chartwell. ON TV in Detroit, as elsewhere, responded to the piracy by modifying pulse signals and introducing new scrambling techniques. In Detroit, Chartwell began migrating to a new generation of decoder boxes in an attempt to stem its piracy problem.

Equally debilitating for ON TV in Detroit was its relationship with WXON, which included disputes over airtime and programming content. After airing the R-rated movie Is There Sex After Death? (which contained considerable sex and nudity) on March 12, 1980, the station then ordered ON TV to screen all movies it aired for WXON executives. More critically, however, the station refused to cede any time before 8 p.m. and aired reruns in that time slot, severely crippling it as a sports broadcaster; WXON noted that it had already committed to air and sold advertising around reruns of the series Baretta in the 7 p.m. hour, and after February 1982, it refused to lease the 7:30 p.m. half hour to ON TV on an as-needed basis. Midweek Red Wings and Tigers games regularly began before ON TV was on the air, forcing the station to join games in progress (as with the Red Wings) or tape delay them (which it did for the Tigers). The flaw became highly visible when the Red Wings played the Calgary Flames in a game on October 29, 1981, in which the Red Wings scored five goals in the first period before ON TV picked up the game. WXON then sued ON TV to get out of what Chartwell claimed was a "fifty-year contract" with the station. After the 1982 season, ON TV dropped its Tigers deal because it could not secure the air time it needed to telecast games in their entirety. As a result, the subscription service could not offer sports programming, nor could it broadcast an adult programming tier, a lucrative add-on with high uptake at STV services nationwide.

When ON TV closed in Detroit on March 31, 1983, with the alleged "censorship" and other issues being cited, Chartwell shuttered a business in which it had invested $13 million but never turned a profit. The system—which was vigorously competing against IT, the subscription service on Ann Arbor–based WIHT (channel 31, now WPXD-TV), and Livonia-based MDS service MORE-TV, in addition to rapidly proliferating cable services—had lost 26,000 of the 68,000 subscribers it claimed at its peak.

In a 1988 interview with The Windsor Star, Doug Johnson—Aben's son, who had started working at the station around the time of the channel switch and progressively took over management duties—would state his regret for his station's foray into subscription television, claiming that it set back the development of WXON by several years.

=== Growth and development ===
As the 1980s progressed, the station began acquiring stronger series, though it continued to focus on mostly buying syndicated product after a brief incursion into production, making 35 hours of a soap opera titled Generations (unrelated to NBC's 1989 soap of the same name). Doug Johnson cited the acquisition of He-Man and the Masters of the Universe and its companion She-Ra: Princess of Power as a turning point for the station's program inventory.

It got a significant boost in the years after WKBD became a Fox charter affiliate in 1986; by the start of the 1990s, with Fox increasing its programming, WXON was able to fill the void WKBD left as a movie station. When fellow Detroit outlet WJBK dropped its CBS affiliation in favor of Fox—displacing WKBD—in 1994, the former network approached WXON for an affiliation deal and priced itself out by asking $200 million for an acquisition instead, with CBS only offering half that asking price.

=== The WB affiliation and sale to Granite ===
On January 11, 1995, WXON became a charter affiliate of the upstart WB Television Network, having signed the month before to join.

Granite Broadcasting agreed in 1996 to buy WXON from the Johnson family for $175 million, the largest purchase in the history of the minority-owned broadcasting company. The sale closed in February 1997; that October, the call letters were changed to WDWB to reflect the network affiliation. The new owners set out to improve a station whose sales force was described by an article in Black Enterprise magazine as "less than aggressive", whose on-air look was considered cheap, and which John Smyntek of the Detroit Free Press described as "the station for Baywatch babes and badly cut movies with a rather amateurish on-air presence". Sarah Norat-Phillips, who had climbed the ranks at Granite's WKBW-TV—an ABC affiliate in Buffalo, New York—was named general manager of WDWB and became one of the first Black women to run a TV station in the region; she focused the station's programming strategy around youth audiences.

Though Granite reluctantly put WDWB on the market in 2001 in an attempt to improve its balance sheet, and bidders such as Tribune Broadcasting and other local station owners were reported to show interest, nothing came of discussions. Tribune was also linked to a possible purchase of WDWB, along with KBWB in San Francisco, in 2003; these were the only two top-10 markets where Tribune did not own a station, but Tribune was reported to have balked at Granite's asking price.

In 2004, the station became the new over-the-air broadcast home of the NBA's Detroit Pistons under a three-year deal, replacing WKBD, which no longer had time to air the team after doing so for 25 years. WDWB also supplanted WKBD as the broadcast home of the Detroit Tigers, airing a slate of 16 games produced by Fox Sports Net Detroit in 2006 after the team had no over-the-air partner in 2005. The Tigers agreement was profitable but not overly so for the station.

Granite's high debt load continued to motivate attempts to sell WDWB and its San Francisco sister station KBWB. In 2004, the company brought in $7.3 million in cash flow, far short of the $38.7 million needed just to service Granite's $517 million in total debt; that year, its stock price fell 75 percent. In September 2005, Granite announced its intention to sell WDWB and KBWB to AM Media Holdings, Inc., a company mostly owned by ACON Investments, for a total of $180 million.

=== MyNetworkTV affiliation ===
An unanticipated event, however, would ultimately quash that deal. In January 2006, The WB and UPN announced their merger into The CW beginning in September. The first confirmed affiliates for the new network included 16 WB affiliates owned by Tribune as well as 13 CBS Corporation–owned UPN outlets, including WKBD-TV and KBHK-TV in San Francisco. This left WDWB and KBWB without an available network affiliation; in Detroit, general manager Norat-Phillips, who had been the general manager of WDWB for nearly all of its ownership by Granite, was not aware of the deal until the Free Press reached her seeking comment.

In mid-February, AM Media allowed Granite to shop WDWB and KBWB to other buyers, with W. Don Cornwell, Granite's CEO, noting that "they are clearly having a hard time deciding whether they should proceed". A deal to sell the two WB affiliates to DS Audible, a consortium of four private equity firms, was reached, with the new buyers paying $30 million less than AM Media would have.

However, once Granite obtained a new senior credit facility, it opted to retain the Detroit station while continuing to seek a different buyer for the San Francisco outlet. One reason was that, unlike KBWB in San Francisco, WDWB was able to secure the affiliation with MyNetworkTV, a new network backed by Fox Television Stations, which had many bypassed UPN affiliates not chosen for The CW. It changed its call sign to WMYD and began branding as "My TV20 Detroit". Granite would sue The WB and CBS for damages from the collapse of the sale and file for Chapter 11 bankruptcy in December 2006, when it settled with the networks for $13.2 million.

In March 2008, WMYD began airing Wolfman Mac's Nightmare Sinema (later known as Wolfman Mac's Chiller Drive-In), a 90-minute comedic "horror host" series hosted by "Wolfman" Mac Kelly featuring vintage sci-fi and horror films, skits and cartoons. The program was dropped from WMYD's schedule on February 14, 2010, three months after Chiller Drive-In reached a deal with the Retro Television Network to show reruns as well as new episodes.

=== Scripps ownership ===
On February 10, 2014, the E. W. Scripps Company, owner of ABC affiliate WXYZ-TV, announced that it would acquire WMYD and WKBW-TV in Buffalo from Granite Broadcasting for $110 million; the deal also included an immediate time brokerage agreement for Scripps to program four to six hours a day of WMYD. The purchase created a duopoly for Scripps in Detroit. After FCC approval, the sale was completed on June 16. Scripps retained two-thirds of the former WMYD workforce, including the entire sales staff.

MyNetworkTV programming moved to WADL on September 20, 2021, with WMYD becoming an independent station again. WMYD affiliated with The CW on November 13, 2023; this came after WADL—which picked up The CW in September (replacing WKBD) in lieu of a pending sale to Mission Broadcasting, an affiliate of The CW's majority owner Nexstar Media Group—abruptly dropped the network on October 29. WADL owner Kevin Adell unsuccessfully sought a cease and desist order against Scripps after the affiliation was announced, claiming Scripps and Nexstar conspired to harm WADL's business and interfere with Mission's acquisition of the station.

WMYD's CW tenure turned out to be an interregnum, as Nexstar opted to not renew the network's affiliation contracts with Scripps-owned stations. CBS agreed to re-affiliate WKBD with The CW on September 1, 2024; this also included co-owned WBFS-TV in Miami joining the network.

In mid-2026, the station rebranded from "TV20 Detroit" to "The Spot — Detroit 20", following the "Spot" branding used by other Scripps-owned independent stations.

== Local programming ==
=== Newscasts ===
On July 14, 2008, WMYD launched a weeknight prime time newscast produced by the Independent News Network (INN) in Davenport, Iowa, competing with WJBK-TV's longer-established hour-long 10 p.m. newscast. The My TV20 News at 10 was produced from INN's studios in Davenport, and utilized contributions from three Detroit-based reporters. In September 2009, Granite took production of the newscast in-house, relocating it to the studio of sister station WISE-TV in Fort Wayne, Indiana (which already provided master control and commercial production services for the company's Midwestern stations). As before, the newscast was produced in advance using centralized anchors, with contributions from Detroit-based reporters. The newscast was a non-factor in the market and very low-rated, with few viewers even aware of its existence.

With the acquisition of the station by Scripps, new sister station WXYZ-TV began producing news programming for WMYD; on June 16, 2014, the station re-launched its primetime newscast as 7 Action News at 10 on TV20 Detroit. (Note: In 1995, WXYZ produced a newscast for WXON to air at 11 p.m. on Monday nights, when Monday Night Football prevented the news from airing at its normal time.) On August 4, 2014, WMYD also introduced a two-hour extension of Action News This Morning, running from 7 to 9 a.m.; both the morning and 10 p.m. newscasts are designed to fully compete against WJBK, which has historically been the only other station in Detroit to air newscasts in these timeslots.

=== Sports programming ===
In October 2014, WMYD acquired a package of Oakland University Golden Grizzlies college basketball games, airing eight men's games and two women's games during the 2014–15 season.

In February 2020, WMYD established a broadcasting agreement with Detroit City FC, a USL Championship soccer team.

In March 2024, WMYD announced an agreement to simulcast five Detroit Pistons games with Bally Sports Detroit (later FanDuel Sports Network Detroit) during April of that year. It was the Pistons' first major over-the-air TV deal since 2007–08. In April 2024, WMYD announced a similar agreement to simulcast three Detroit Red Wings games. The Pistons simulcasts returned to WMYD for the 2024–25 season, while the Red Wings moved their simulcasts to WJBK.

On May 12, 2026, with the closure of FanDuel Sports Network, the Pistons announced a multi-year agreement with Scripps Sports under which its regional games would air on WMYD and a direct-to-consumer streaming service beginning in the 2026–27 season.

== Technical information ==
=== Subchannels ===
The station's ATSC 1.0 channels are carried on the multiplexed signals of other Detroit television stations:

Subchannels provided by WMYD (ATSC 1.0)
Subchannel	Res.	Short name	Programming	ATSC 1.0 host
20.1	720p	WMYD-HD	Main WMYD programming	WXYZ-TV
20.2	480i	WMYD-AT	Antenna TV	WDIV-TV
20.3	480i	WMYD-MS	Ion Mystery	WJBK
20.4	480i	HSN	HSN	WXYZ-TV

=== Analog-to-digital conversion ===
WMYD ended regular programming on its analog signal, over UHF channel 20, on February 17, 2009, the original target date for full-power television stations in the United States to transition from analog to digital broadcasts under federal mandate; WMYD and WPXD-TV were the only Detroit stations to carry out the switch in February instead of waiting for the new June 12 date. The station's digital signal continued to broadcast on its pre-transition UHF channel 21. As part of the SAFER Act, WMYD kept its analog signal on the air until March 4 to inform viewers of the digital television transition through a loop of public service announcements from the National Association of Broadcasters.

=== ATSC 3.0 lighthouse service ===
On December 7, 2020, WMYD converted from an ATSC 1.0 signal to ATSC 3.0 (NextGen TV) broadcasting. The station's ATSC 1.0 subchannels were moved to other broadcasters for simulcasting, while WMYD became the "lighthouse" host for the ATSC 3.0 transmission of WJBK, WDIV-TV, WXYZ-TV, WMYD, and WWJ-TV.

Subchannels of WMYD (ATSC 3.0)
Subchannel	Res.	Short name	Programming
2.1	1080p	WJBK	Fox (WJBK)
4.1	1080p	WDIV-HD	NBC (WDIV-TV)
7.1	1080p	WXYZ-HD	ABC (WXYZ-TV)
7.99	720p	WXYZMOB	Mobile test feed of WXYZ-TV
20.1	1080p	WMYD-HD	Independent
20.99	720p	WMYDMOB	Mobile test feed of WMYD
62.1	1080p	WWJ-HD	CBS (WWJ-TV)

Subchannel broadcast with digital rights management

Because of the Detroit–Windsor area's importance in the American and Canadian auto industries, WMYD is the key in a "Motown Test Track" run by Pearl TV, a consortium of commercial broadcasters, that works on testing use cases relevant to the automotive industry such as datacasting software updates to fleet vehicles. The ceremonial first file broadcast was an 1886 patent for an early automobile. Testing was also done on data hand-offs between transmitters, utilizing WMYD and three other ATSC 3.0 facilities in Michigan.

== See also ==
- Media in Detroit

== Bibliography ==
- Castelnero, Gordon (2006). TV Land Detroit. Ann Arbor, Michigan: University of Michigan Press. ISBN 978-0-472-03124-5.
