= Sir Graves Ghastly =

Fictional character

Lawson Deming as "Sir Graves Ghastly"

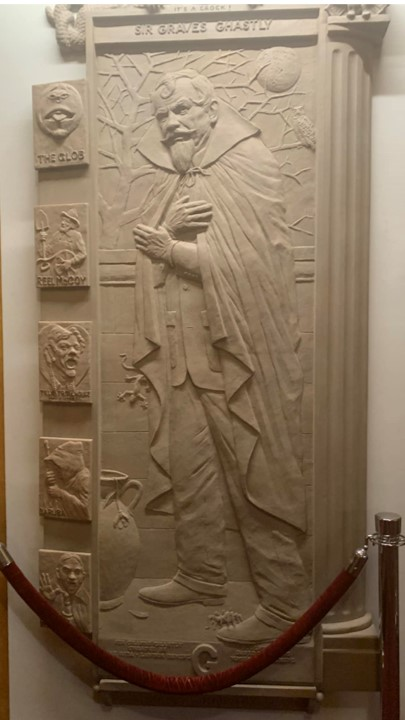
The life-sized relief sculpture of Sir Graves Ghastly created by his son, David Deming. On permanent display in the inner lobby of the Redford Theatre in Detroit, Michigan.

Sir Graves Ghastly was a character created by Cleveland-born actor Lawson J. Deming (1913–2007) for the popular television show of the same name.

Sir Graves was a vampire whose persona, look, and exaggerated laugh ("Nnnnyeah-ha-ha-ha-haaaaaaaaah!") were intended to parody the cliched portrayal of vampires in horror films of the time. Other characters on the show included Sir Graves' sidekick Baruba, a ghostly apparition known only as The Glob, and a cemetery caretaker named Reel McCoy, who traditionally opened each episode by unearthing a movie reel from what appeared to be a grave. The show followed a consistent format of back-to-back horror films, interspersed with brief sketch comedy pieces featuring the many characters. The program was originally billed as Sir Graves' Big Show, but later became known simply by the character's name.

Sir Graves Ghastly had its longest run Saturday afternoons on WJBK, TV2 in Detroit, from 1967 to 1982: fifteen seasons in all. In the 1970s, Deming marketed the show to Cleveland and Washington, D.C., where it also became a hit, but his popularity in those markets never quite reached that of the Detroit-area audience. The growing popularity of televised sports in the early 1980s, particularly college football, sent Sir Graves into hiatus in November 1982. A management change during this time led to the program being officially cancelled in 1983 before any other shows were produced. As he did while his show was running, Deming continued to do speaking engagements and personal appearances well into the 1990s.
