= Art Regner =

American sports radio broadcaster and writer

Art Regner is an American sports radio broadcaster and sports writer. He was a columnist for Fox Sports Detroit blog who has been on the Detroit sports airwaves, for WDFN and WXYT, since the 1990s. He is a native of Livonia, Michigan and graduated from Franklin High School. Regner is a graduate of the University of Michigan and has co-written three sports books on what it means to be a Michigan Wolverine and Detroit Red Wing and The Great Book of Detroit Sports Lists with his good friend Michael Stone.

== Radio career ==
On April 2, 2007, Regner returned to WDFN Sports Radio 1130, debuting as a guest co-host on the Stoney & Wojo show for the Detroit Tigers home opener. Regner began his career at WDFN as an original on-air voice. He covered the Detroit Lions and Detroit Red Wings, hosting post game shows for each team. Regner became especially beloved for his passionate rants on WDFN's Detroit Lions' post game shows and for how he managed callers with similar frustrations. He also hosted a Red Wings weekly show with Chris Osgood as a frequent guest.

When WXYT won Detroit Tigers & Detroit Red Wings broadcast rights in 2000, the entire station adopted a Sports Talk format and Regner was the first WDFN on-air personality to join "Team 1270." He was later joined by fellow 'DFNers Pat Caputo, Marc Spindler and Terry Foster.

The station changed its tag line several times as the Detroit Lions eventually signed a broadcast rights deal with WXYT and their FM partner WKRK respectively. Regner was a major pre and post game voice on Red Wing broadcasts and professed to be "Lions Free" after being let down one too many times by the Honolulu Blue and Silver.

In 2005, he became co-host of The Big Show with Doug Karsch, which aired weekdays from 3PM until 7PM in direct competition with WDFN's anchor show and ratings leader, Stoney and Wojo. Karsch and Regner were heavily promoted and often broadcast from locations, like the Tigers series in Chicago and 2006 play-offs in Yankee Stadium. Yet WXYT was constantly tinkering with their line-up, even dropping the all-sports format for a spell when Opie and Anthony replaced a local morning show hosted by Scott "The Gator" Anderson and Marc Spindler. In December 2006, Regner's contract was not renewed by WXYT in an apparent cost-cutting move. A week later WKRK fired Mark Wilson and Rob Parker, hosts of Parker & The Man in a similar local sports radio downsize. Regner being let go prompted many loyalists to email notes of dismay to then GM Kevin Murphy.

Regner's non-compete clause after being released by WXYT ended March 29, 2007. He rejoined WDFN publicly on air for Detroit Tigers Opening Day, co-hosting with Mike Stone on April 2, 2007. He has been part of WDFN since that day.

In March 2011, Regner became the featured blogger at FoxSportsDetroit.com and his blog quickly became one of the websites most popular destinations. He also host a weekly show called "Lunch with Art" on FoxSportsDetroit.com interviewing many local and national Sports celebrities. Art is also a valued member of St. Damian's Red Softball Team, and one of the founding members of the Relics.

== Bibliography ==
- Regner, Art. What it Means to Be a Wolverine: Michigan's Greatest Players, Talk about Michigan Football (What It Means) (with Kevin Allen, Nate Brown and foreword by Bo Schembechler). Triumph Books. 2005
- Regner, Art. What It Means to Be a Red Wing: Detroit's Greatest Players Talk About Detroit Hockey. (with Kevin Allen and foreword by Steve Yzerman). Triumph Books. 2006
