= WXYT =

WXYT may refer to:

- WXYT (AM), a radio station (1270 AM) licensed to Detroit, Michigan, United States
- WXYT-FM, a radio station (97.1 FM) licensed to Detroit, Michigan, United States
