= Matt Dery =

American sportscaster (born 1973)

Matthew Dery (born 1973) is an American sportscaster, and former midday host at Detroit Sports 105.1 - WMGC-FM, a sports radio station near Detroit, Michigan. Dery was the Sports Director at WDFN from 1996 to 2009, after working for WHK Radio in Cleveland, Ohio. Dery announced his resignation from WDFN in mid-March, and accepted an update anchor position at competitor WXYT-FM, where he resigned in July 2013, rounding out his 17 years of experience as a Detroit sportscaster. He now hosts the Locked on Lions podcasts since 2016.

== Early life and education ==
Dery is a native of Pepper Pike, Ohio. He graduated from the Syracuse University's S. I. Newhouse School of Public Communications in 1995. While at Syracuse, he began his broadcasting career at WAER-FM calling Syracuse Orange games.

== Career ==
He was the radio voice of the Detroit Titans men's basketball and was the host for WXYT's Detroit Pistons pregame, postgame and halftime segments.

On television, Dery filled in for George Blaha on Fox Sports Detroit's Detroit Pistons broadcasts when Blaha does Michigan State Spartans football games. He has also called MAC basketball on FSD. He can currently be seen on the 7 Sports Cave WXYZ-TV show on Sunday mornings. He has also served as radio analyst for Oakland University basketball and most recently, Eastern Michigan.
