= WWJ =

WWJ may refer to:

In broadcasting, the following stations in Detroit, Michigan, United States

Current stations

- WWJ (AM), a radio station (950 AM) with an all-news format owned by Audacy
- WWJ-TV, a CBS owned and operated television station (channel 21, virtual 62)

Stations formerly known as WWJ

- WXYT-FM, a radio station (97.1 FM) that was known as WWJ-FM from 1948 to 1981
- WDIV-TV, an NBC affiliated television station (channel 4 virtual/32 physical) that was known as WWJ-TV from 1947 to 1978

Other

- Wireless Watch Japan
- Water Well Journal
- World Wind Java release
