= Terry Foster =

American journalist (born 1959)

- Presenting career
- Style: Sports radio
- Country: United States
- Previous shows: Valenti & Foster
- Website: terryfostersblog.com

Terry Foster is an American sports columnist and radio personality in Detroit. He co-hosted Valenti & Foster on WXYT-FM The Ticket, a sports radio station, with Mike Valenti for 13 years until his retirement. It can be listened to worldwide (minus CBS restrictions) on The Ticket's website. Foster wrote a book called 100 Things Tiger Fans Should Know and Do Before They Die. He also co-wrote The Great Detroit Sports Debate with fellow Detroit writer Drew Sharp. He is a sports columnist for The Detroit News and also writes enterprise pieces on the Detroit Lions, a twice a week page two column and daily blog at detnews.com. He began his broadcasting career in the 1990s on WDFN in Detroit before moving to WXYT. Of the many broadcasters who have moved between the Detroit sports radio rivals, only Foster has worked at WDFN twice and WXYT twice.

A native Detroiter, he began his journalism career in 1981 with The Grand Rapids Press. He later moved to the Detroit Free Press in 1982, where he covered high school sports in Macomb County. He stayed with the Free Press until 1988, when he left for The Detroit News after being approached by the newspaper for the second time. He earned his journalism degree from Central Michigan University and was once was a bartender and short order cook at the Lindell Athletic Club in downtown Detroit.

From 1988 to 1994, he was the Pistons beat writer for The Detroit News during the Bad Boys era. During that time he also covered Michigan Wolverines football, golf, tennis and auto racing. Foster has covered: Super Bowls, World Series, NBA Finals, Stanley Cup Finals, 1996 Summer Olympics, and Wimbledon. Foster has also contributed to other broadcasts and the Grand Rapids Press. In 2006, Valenti and Foster broadcast from the 2006 Winter Olympics in Torino, Italy.

Foster is an active member of the Detroit Sports Broadcasters Association, founded in 1948 by pioneer Detroit Tigers announcer Ty Tyson. He started a public diary at TerryFostersblog.com.

On Monday, August 22, 2016, The Detroit News announced that Terry Foster had suffered a mild stroke and would return to the air on 97.1 The Ticket beginning October 3, 2016. Foster didn't end up returning to the show until January, 2017. He announced his retirement on April 20, 2017.
