= FanDuel Sports Network Detroit =

American regional sports network

- Type: Regional sports network
- Country: United States
- Broadcast area: Michigan; Northeastern Indiana; Northwest Ohio; Northeast Wisconsin; Nationwide (via satellite)
- Network: FanDuel Sports Network
- Headquarters: Southfield, Michigan

Programming
- Language: English
- Picture format: 1080p (HDTV); 480i (SDTV)

Ownership
- Owner: Main Street Sports Group

History
- Launched: September 17, 1997 (29 years ago)
- Replaced: Pro-Am Sports System (unrelated/defunct)
- Closed: September 30, 2026 (40 days ago)
- Replaced by: Tigers/Red Wings- Detroit SportsNet Pistons- WMYD
- Former names: Fox Sports Detroit (1997–1999, 2008–2021); Fox Sports Net Detroit (1999–2004); FSN Detroit (2004–2008); Bally Sports Detroit (2021-2024)

Links
- Website: www.fanduelsportsnetwork.com

Availability (Some events may air on overflow feed FanDuel Sports Network Detroit Extra due to event conflicts)

Streaming media
- FanDuel Sports Network app: www.fanduelsportsnetwork/ (U.S. cable internet subscribers only; requires login from participating providers to stream content; some events may not be available due to league rights restrictions)
- DirecTV Stream: Internet Protocol television

FanDuel Sports Network Detroit was an American regional sports network owned by Main Street Sports Group (formerly Diamond Sports Group) and operates as an affiliate of FanDuel Sports Network. It provided coverage of local sports teams in the state of Michigan, primarily focusing on those in Metro Detroit. The network aired exclusive broadcasts of games involving the Detroit Tigers, Detroit Pistons, and Detroit Red Wings; repeats of Detroit Lions preseason games; and some high school sports.

FanDuel Sports Network Detroit was available on cable television throughout Michigan, as well as in northeastern Indiana, northwest Ohio and some portions of northeastern Wisconsin and nationwide on satellite via DirecTV. FanDuel Sports Network Detroit is available for streaming through DirecTV Stream. The network's production facilities and offices were based in Southfield, Michigan, with master control operations based at the Main Street Sports Group Media Operations Center in Atlanta, Georgia. It also maintains dedicated remote sets in the concourses of Comerica Park and Little Caesars Arena.

== History ==
=== Beginnings ===
FanDuel Sports Network Detroit traces its origins to 1996, when News Corporation purchased 50% of the Prime Network, a group of regional sports networks owned by Liberty Media, and immediately rebranded them under the "Fox Sports Network" banner. At the time of the purchase, Post-Newsweek Stations (owners of Detroit NBC affiliate WDIV-TV, channel 4) owned the Detroit-based Pro-Am Sports System (PASS Sports), which served the local affiliate of the Prime Network. News Corporation announced plans to launch a Fox Sports Net affiliate in Michigan, and made a surprise bid for, and won, the local cable television rights to NBA games involving the Detroit Pistons.

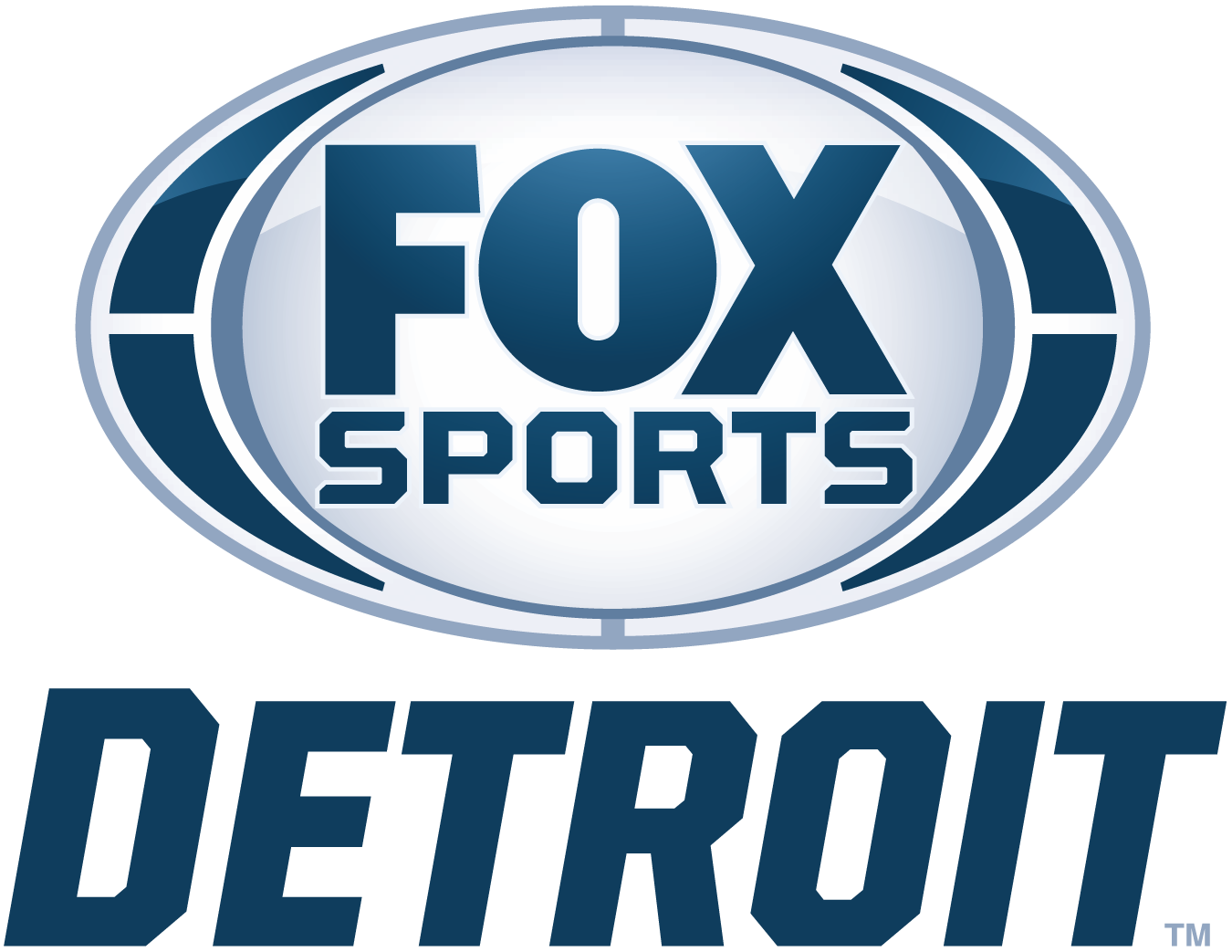
Former Fox Sports Detroit logo, used from 2012 to 2021

When PASS Sports' respective National Hockey League and Major League Baseball broadcast rights to the Detroit Red Wings and Detroit Tigers franchises came up for renewal, Fox Sports Net made a bid for the contracts and won them both. Fox Sports decided to push the launch date of the new channel forward in time for the beginning of the 1997–98 NHL season and 1998 MLB season; Fox Sports Detroit began broadcasting on September 17, 1997. Post-Newsweek, meanwhile, concluded that its coverage area was not large enough to support two RSNs and sold the remainder of its Tigers and Pistons contracts, and the contract of sportscaster John Keating, to Fox Sports Detroit. Post-Newsweek shut down PASS Sports on October 31, 1997, leaving Fox Sports Detroit as the sole regional sports network in Michigan.

=== Studios ===
From its launch until January 16, 2008, Fox Sports Detroit broadcast its studio shows out of FSN Northwest's facilities in Bellevue, Washington. On October 1, 2009, the network unveiled a new all-digital high definition-capable studio in its Southfield headquarters dubbed the "Call Sam Studio", named after its sponsor, the Sam Bernstein Law Firm. It serves as the production base of the pre-game/post-game shows Tigers Live, Pistons Live and Red Wings Live, as well the magazine shows of all three teams and all of the channel's other local programming. It was expected that 80% of the shows produced from the studio would be produced and broadcast in HD. The first program to originate from the new studio was Wingspan, a special previewing the 2009–10 Red Wings season, on October 1.

=== Tigers, Pistons and Red Wings switch to cable full-time ===
The channel shared professional team coverage rights with some Detroit area broadcast television stations until the spring of 2008. In March 2008, the channel signed new long-term contracts with the Pistons, Red Wings and Tigers to broadcast more games than in previous years, becoming the exclusive local home of all three teams for the first time until at least 2018. This leaves only the NFL's Detroit Lions as the only local professional sports team in Detroit to have all of its games on broadcast television.

Around this time a 720p high definition simulcast feed of Fox Sports Detroit was launched. It telecasts all Detroit Pistons, Detroit Red Wings and Detroit Tigers games in HD, their respective pre-game and post-game shows and team magazine shows, as well as all college and high school games and programs. Wingspan became the first locally produced pre-recorded program to be broadcast in HD when it began in 2009. In 2010, Central Collegiate Hockey Association (CCHA) and MHSAA games began airing in HD. Today almost all programming is shown in HD.

=== Detroit Lions coverage added ===
On May 21, 2015, the Detroit Lions announced a multi-year broadcast partnership with Fox Sports Detroit and WJBK (Fox 2). Fox Sports Detroit produces the preseason game broadcasts with Fox 2 producing the pre-game and post-game segments. The games air live on Fox 2 and the rest of the Detroit Lions Television Network, with re-airings on Bally Sports Detroit. Bally Sports Detroit also airs Lions Live after regular season games, and Monday head coach press conferences.

=== Change of ownership and rebrandings ===
Logo of Bally Sports Detroit from 2021 to 2024

On December 14, 2017, as part of a merger between both companies, The Walt Disney Company announced plans to acquire all 22 regional Fox Sports networks from 21st Century Fox, including Fox Sports Detroit. However, on June 27, 2018, the Justice Department ordered their divestment under antitrust grounds, citing Disney's ownership of ESPN Inc.

On May 3, 2019, Sinclair Broadcast Group and Entertainment Studios (through their joint venture, Diamond Sports Group) bought Fox Sports Networks from The Walt Disney Company for $10.6 billion. The deal closed on August 22, 2019.

In October 2020, YouTube TV and Hulu failed to reach agreements with network owner Sinclair, leading those streaming services to drop the channel.

On November 17, 2020, Sinclair announced an agreement with casino operator Bally's Corporation to serve as a new naming rights partner for the FSN channels. Sinclair announced the new Bally Sports branding for the channels on January 27, 2021. On March 31, 2021, coinciding with the 2021 Major League Baseball season, Fox Sports Detroit was rebranded as Bally Sports Detroit, along with 18 other regional sports networks following suit in their respective regions.

On March 14, 2023, Diamond Sports filed for Chapter 11 Bankruptcy. As a result of the bankruptcy, a carriage dispute arose between Diamond Sports and certain cable companies, leading to Xfinity dropping Bally Sports Detroit (as well as all other Bally Sports networks in their respective markets) on May 1, 2024. Xfinity and Diamond / Bally reached a new agreement and Bally Sports returned to Xfinity customers on August 1, 2024.

On October 16, 2024, it was revealed in a court filing that Diamond had reached a new sponsorship agreement with FanDuel Group, under which it intended to rebrand Bally Sports as the FanDuel Sports Network; on October 18, 2024, Diamond officially announced the rebranding, which took effect October 21. Under the agreement, FanDuel has the option to take a minority equity stake of up to 5% once Diamond Sports exits bankruptcy.

=== Closure ===
On February 9, 2026, amid uncertainties surrounding the network's future, and Main Street Sports Group having terminated its agreements with all MLB teams that were under contract with the network, Ilitch Sports Entertainment announced that it would move the Tigers to MLB Local Media beginning in the 2026 MLB season, and that MLB Local Media would support distribution of the Red Wings' own broadcasts beginning with in 2026–27 NHL season (with the two teams being carried on the part-time RSN Detroit SportsNet). On May 13, 2026, the Detroit Pistons announced that they would move to WMYD 20 as part of an agreement with Scripps Sports.

Main Street Sports Group anticipated that all FDSN channels would wind down their operations following the 2025–26 NBA and NHL regular seasons; the Detroit channel subsequently carried its final live broadcast on April 15, 2026, the Red Wings' season finale against the Florida Panthers. Although the Pistons reached the NBA playoffs, the NBA's new media rights deals as of the 2025–26 season no longer allow regional broadcasts during the first round. Like the other FanDuel Sports Networks, it continued to carry mostly pre-recorded low-budget programming until its closure on September 30, 2026.

== Programming ==
=== Local team coverage ===
==== Professional teams ====
- Detroit Red Wings – Prior to the 2026-27 NHL season, FanDuel Sports Network Detroit held the exclusive local television rights to 70 Detroit Red Wings regular season games, as well as some preseason games and the first round of the playoffs. Red Wings Live airs before and after all games.
- Detroit Tigers – Prior to the 2026 MLB season, FanDuel Sports Network Detroit held the exclusive local television rights to at least 150 Detroit Tigers regular season games, as well as some Spring training games. Tigers Live airs before and after all regular season games, and after all playoff games.
- Detroit Pistons – FanDuel Sports Network Detroit holds the exclusive local television rights to up to 70 regular season Detroit Pistons games, as well as some early round playoff games. Pistons Live airs before and after all games.
- Detroit Lions – FanDuel Sports Network Detroit airs repeats of Detroit Lions preseason games. It also airs Lions Live after regular season games, and the Monday press conference with the Lions' head coach.

==== Minor league teams ====
- Grand Rapids Griffins – FanDuel Sports Network Detroit aired a select number of Grand Rapids Griffins regular season and playoff games during the nhl lockout as fox sports Detroit.
- Motor City Cruise - Fanduel Sports Network Detroit airedselect home games of Motor City Cruise until Fanduel Sports Network went under.

==== High school sports ====
- Michigan High School Athletic Association (MHSAA) football playoffs
- MHSAA girls and boys basketball state finals
- MHSAA Championships (for all sports; events are either broadcast on television or streamed on the channel's website)

==== Weekly shows ====
- Pistons Weekly – A 30-minute in-season show featuring off the court stories from the Detroit Pistons. Hosted by George Blaha, the program also airs on WDIV-TV.
- Pistons In Focus – A 30-minute show that premiered during the 2009–10 season with biographies of notable Pistons players and coaches past and present, hosted by Eli Zaret. Those examined have included Isiah Thomas, Chuck Daly, Bill Laimbeer, Dave Bing and Tayshaun Prince.
- Wingspan – a 30-minute in-season show featuring off-the-ice stories of the Detroit Red Wings.
- Inside the Tigers – A 30-minute in-season show featuring off-the-field stories of the Detroit Tigers.
- Inside Michigan Football – A 30-minute weekly discussion of University of Michigan Wolverines football with head coach Sherrone Moore, hosted by Jim Brandstatter. The program also features interview segments with Wolverines players, as well as locker room footage and special features presented by Doug Karsch. Formerly known as Michigan Replay, which began on WDIV-TV in 1980 (its original title was retired in honor of former Michigan head coach Lloyd Carr). It is also shown on Big Ten Network and ABC affiliate WXYZ-TV (channel 7) and via Big Ten Network On Demand.
- Inside Michigan Basketball – A 30-minute weekly discussion of University of Michigan Wolverines men's basketball with head coach Dusty May, hosted by Matt Shepard. Maintaining a format similar to Inside Michigan Football, the program is also shown on Big Ten Network and available via Big Ten Network On Demand.
- Michigan Sports Weekly – A weekly series chronicling the University of Michigan Wolverines sports scene; it is hosted by Doug Karsch. The program is also shown on Big Ten Network and the Michigan Channel.
- Spartan Sports Zone – A weekly program chronicling the Michigan State University Spartans sports scene; it is hosted by Dave Ellis. The program is also shown on Big Ten Network and Fox College Sports Atlantic.
- One on One with Tom Izzo – A 30-minute show featuring Michigan State University Spartans men's basketball head coach Tom Izzo and sports anchor Mickey York. It is also shown on Big Ten Network.
- One on One with Jonathan Smith – A 30-minute show featuring Michigan State University Spartans football head coach Jonathan Smith and sports anchor Mickey York. It is also shown on Big Ten Network.
- Michigan Golf Live – A pre-recorded weekly show that promotes golfing and golf courses in Michigan, hosted by Bill Hobson.

==== Former programs ====
- The Detroit Sports Report (or simply DSR) – A Detroit/Michigan-centered sports news show created in September 2000 by Fox Sports Net to help increase ratings for the National Sports Report. Marc Soicher and Angie Arlotti (now Mentink) were the original anchors of the 10:00 p.m. show, while Soicher hosted a 7:00 p.m. edition of the program solo. Mickey York and Brad Adam hosted the weekend editions of the program. In 2003, Mickey York promoted to weeknight co-anchor replacing Soicher, following his departure for FSN Rocky Mountain, with Ryan Field (previously with WJBK and sports radio station WDFN) replacing York as weekend anchor in addition to serving as a correspondent. Ratings for the Detroit Sports Report remained decent, despite declining ratings for the National Sports Report, which itself was canceled in 2002; FSN dropped many of the regional sports news programs over the next few years, with the Detroit Sports Report being the last to be canceled in April 2007.
- Pistons Insider – A 30-minute pre-recorded in-season pregame show in which Matt Shepard and Pete Skorich preview the night's Pistons opponent. It was canceled after the 2008–09 season.
- Motor City Memories – Discussion of memorable Detroit Pistons teams of the past, hosted by George Blaha. It was replaced by Pistons In Focus for the 2009–10 season.
- Spotlight: Detroit – A series profiling prominent Detroit sports figures.
- In My Own Words: Detroit – A 30-minute interview featuring a sports figure in Detroit. This show is similar to Chris Myers Interview. The show debuted September 9, 2007. John Keating was the host. The program was canceled in 2008.
- MHSAA Football Friday Overtime – Debuted in August 2011, the program includes highlights, analysis and interviews from high school football games around the state. Hosted by Mickey York and Rob Rubick, it aired live Friday nights at 12:00 a.m. during the fall.
- Fox Sports Detroit was the home of the WNBA's Detroit Shock until the 2009 season, after which the team relocated to Tulsa, Oklahoma.
- State Champs! High School Sports Show – A 30-minute show focusing on Michigan high school sports and certain non-athletic competitions including statewide school participation for the FIRST Robotics Competition.

==== Specials ====
- FSN Basement: All Star Edition 2005 – Featuring interviews with George Kell and Al Kaline, each recalling their memories of playing for the Tigers and working together in the television booth. It was re-aired several times in late March 2009 in memory of former long-time Tigers play-by-play announcer George Kell, who died on March 24, 2009, at age 86.
- Ernie Harwell: We'll Remember – A tribute special shown after the death of legendary Tigers broadcaster Ernie Harwell on May 5, 2010.
- A New Day for Detroit – about Detroit's recent sports renaissance and economic revival, focusing on the construction of the Little Caesars Arena in Midtown Detroit, the home of the Pistons (who had played at The Palace of Auburn Hills since 1988) and the Red Wings (who had played at the Joe Louis Arena since 1979), which will mean both teams' 2017–2018 seasons is the first time since the Lions' move to the Pontiac Silverdome in 1975 (and subsequent return to Detroit when they moved to Ford Field in 2002), that all four of Detroit's major professional teams play in the city. It premiered on April 28, 2017, and was narrated by Oscar-winning actor and Detroit area native J. K. Simmons.
- The Roar of '84 - about the 1984 World Series Champion Detroit Tigers
- Miguel Cabrera: One of a Kind: Documenting the career of longtime Tigers slugger Miguel Cabrera

== Notable on-air staff ==
=== Hosts and reporters ===
- Mickey York – Tigers and Pistons host and reporter (2000–2025)
- Trevor Thompson – Red Wings and Tigers reporter (2000–2025)
- Natalie Kerwin – Red Wings, Tigers, and Pistons host and reporter (2022–2026)
- Dannie Rogers – Lions host and Tigers, Red Wings, and Pistons reporter (2021–2026)
- Johnny Kane – Pistons and Tigers host and reporter and fill-in play-by-play (2017–2026)
- Matt Shepard - college/high school sports play by play (2000–2023) Tigers, Red Wings and Pistons host and reporter (2000–2023) Fill in play by play (2000–2023)
- Daniella Bruce - Red Wings and Tigers co-host and reporter (2022–2026)

=== Detroit Tigers ===
- Jason Benetti – Tigers play-by-play commentator (2024–2026)
- Dan Dickerson – Tigers fill-in play-by-play commentator (2024–2026)
- Dan Petry – Tigers studio analyst (2019–2026); Tigers fill-in color commentator (2021–2026)
- Todd Jones – Tigers studio analyst (2023–2026); Tigers fill-in color commentator (2023–2026)
- Carlos Peña – Tigers fill-in color commentator (2024–2026)
- Andy Dirks – Tigers analyst (2024–2026)

=== Detroit Red Wings ===
- Ken Daniels – Red Wings play-by-play (1997–2026)
- Mickey Redmond – Red Wings analyst (1997–2026)
- Chris Osgood – Red Wings studio analyst, select road games analyst (2013–2026)
- Larry Murphy – Red Wings studio analyst (2006–2013, 2019–2026)
- Jimmy Howard – Red Wings studio analyst and reporter

=== Detroit Pistons ===
- George Blaha – Pistons play-by-play (1997–2026)
- Greg Kelser – Pistons color commentator (1997–2026)
- Grant Long – Pistons analyst (2014–2026)
- Tim McCormick – Pistons analyst (2017–2026)

=== College/high school sports ===
- Evan Stockton – High school/college sports play-by-play (2020–2026)
- Dan Dickerson – High school/college sports play-by-play (2002–2026)
- Fred Pletsch – High school/college hockey play-by-play and high school/ college hockey analyst (2007–2026)
- Devin Gardner – High school/college football analyst and reporter and Detroit Lions pre-season analyst (2019–2026)
- Rob Rubick – High school/college football analyst (2003–2026)
- Mateen Cleaves – High school/college basketball analyst (2008–2026)
- Kara Liles - High school/college basketball reporter (2022–2026)

=== Former personalities ===
- Rod Allen – Tigers color commentator (2003–2018). Currently working for FanDuel Sports Network Florida as a game analyst for the Miami Marlins.
- Ryan Field – host/field reporter (2003–2013). Was also on Fox Sports 1. Currently a sports anchor at WABC-TV in New York City.
- Ernie Harwell – Tigers play-by-play (1997–2002). Died in 2010.
- Shannon Hogan – Red Wings, Tigers, and Pistons reporter. Left to join New York Islanders broadcast team at MSG Sportsnet.
- Darren Eliot – Red Wings studio analyst and select road games analyst (2012–2019). Now an executive for the Vegas Golden Knights.
- Mario Impemba – Tigers play-by-play (2002–2018). Later worked for a season with Boston Red Sox Radio Network, but was let go.
- Al Kaline – Tigers color commentator (1997–2002). Later worked as a Tigers executive. Died in 2020.
- Brooke Fletcher – Red Wings, Tigers, and Pistons host and reporter and high school football reporter (2018–2022). Left to co-host the Bally Sports show The Rally and also covers MLB on Apple TV+ and college football on the Big Ten Network.
- Manon Rhéaume – Red Wings studio analyst/reporter (2021–2022)
- Jack Morris – Tigers color commentator (2015–2016, 2019–2022)
- Earl Cureton - Pistons Analyst and High school and college basketball analyst (2003–2023). Died in January 2024.
- Kirk Gibson – Tigers fill-in color commentator (1998–2002, 2015–2024)
- Craig Monroe – Tigers studio analyst (2012–2024); Tigers fill-in color commentator (2021–2022); Tigers primary color commentator (2023–2024)
- Austin Jackson – Tigers fill-in color commentator (2021)
- John Keating – Red Wings and Tigers host and reporter (1997–2025)

== Other services ==
=== Bally Sports Detroit Extra ===
Bally Sports Detroit Extra is a game-time only alternate feed of Bally Sports Detroit that was originally branded as Fox Sports Detroit Plus. It was launched in 2007 to solve scheduling conflicts, such as those of the Detroit Tigers, Pistons and Red Wings, as well as CCHA games, MHSAA finals for football and basketball, and The Mid-American Conference basketball tournament (via Bally Sports Ohio). It is frequently used for live college football, college basketball, college baseball and tennis telecasts and other events distributed nationally by BSN, to avoid conflicts with local coverage.

Bally Sports Detroit Extra has been used for special alternate feeds of local games, such as the annual "¡Fiesta Tigres!" game which celebrates Latin American players, in which alternate announcers conducted Spanish language play-by-play; a "Position-by-position" Tigers game, with the camera isolating on a different defensive player every inning featuring John Keating on play-by-play; as well as a "Social networking" Tigers telecast in which the channel's staff answered viewer questions from Facebook, Twitter, and their own website.

=== Fox Sports Detroit On Demand ===
Fox Sports Detroit On Demand was the video on demand service of Fox Sports Detroit. Launched in October 2008, its offerings included the channel's magazine and coach's shows, which were presented commercial-free. On August 7, 2009, Fox Sports Detroit On Demand began carrying full-length presentations of the channel's Tigers game broadcasts.

== See also ==
- Media in Detroit
