= Mike Stone (radio personality) =

American radio presenter (born 1958)

- Born: Michael Stone; November 29, 1958 (age 67); Philadelphia, Pennsylvania, United States
- Education: American University
- Spouse: Cyndi Stone (m. 1996)
- Children: 2
- Presenting career
- Stations: WXYT-FM, Detroit, Michigan
- Network: Audacy, Inc.
- Style: Sports radio
- Country: United States
- Previous shows: Stoney and Wojo; Stoney and Bill; Jamie and Stoney; Stoney and Jansen

Michael "Stoney" Stone (born December 29, 1958) is a long-time American radio host that helped pioneer the sports radio format in Detroit, Michigan. He is best known as the former host for Stoney and Wojo at WDFN from 1994 to 2009, then became the morning show host at WXYT-FM from 2009 until 2024 where he stepped down from full-time host to fill-in host. He also appears weekly on the late Sunday night sports newscast at WXYZ-TV.

== Early life ==
Stone is a Philadelphia native, who grew up as a big fan of Bruce Springsteen and Philadelphia sports. He would attend American University in Washington D.C. and graduate in 1980.

== Career ==
Stone began his sports journalism career as a television producer for The George Michael Sports Machine at WRC-TV in the mid-1980s, then quit seeking better opportunities and temporarily worked at a bar greeter until he was sucker-punched on Saint Patrick's Day. In 1986, his friend Bernie Smilovitz had offered him a position as sports producer at WDIV-TV in Detroit. He initially lived alone before becoming roommates with Detroit Free Press columnist Mitch Albom and Ken Dross in Farmington Hills, then they moved to Franklin where he became a producer and co-host for The Sunday Sports Albom at WLLZ-FM (now WDZH-FM) in 1988.

=== WDFN (1994–2009) ===
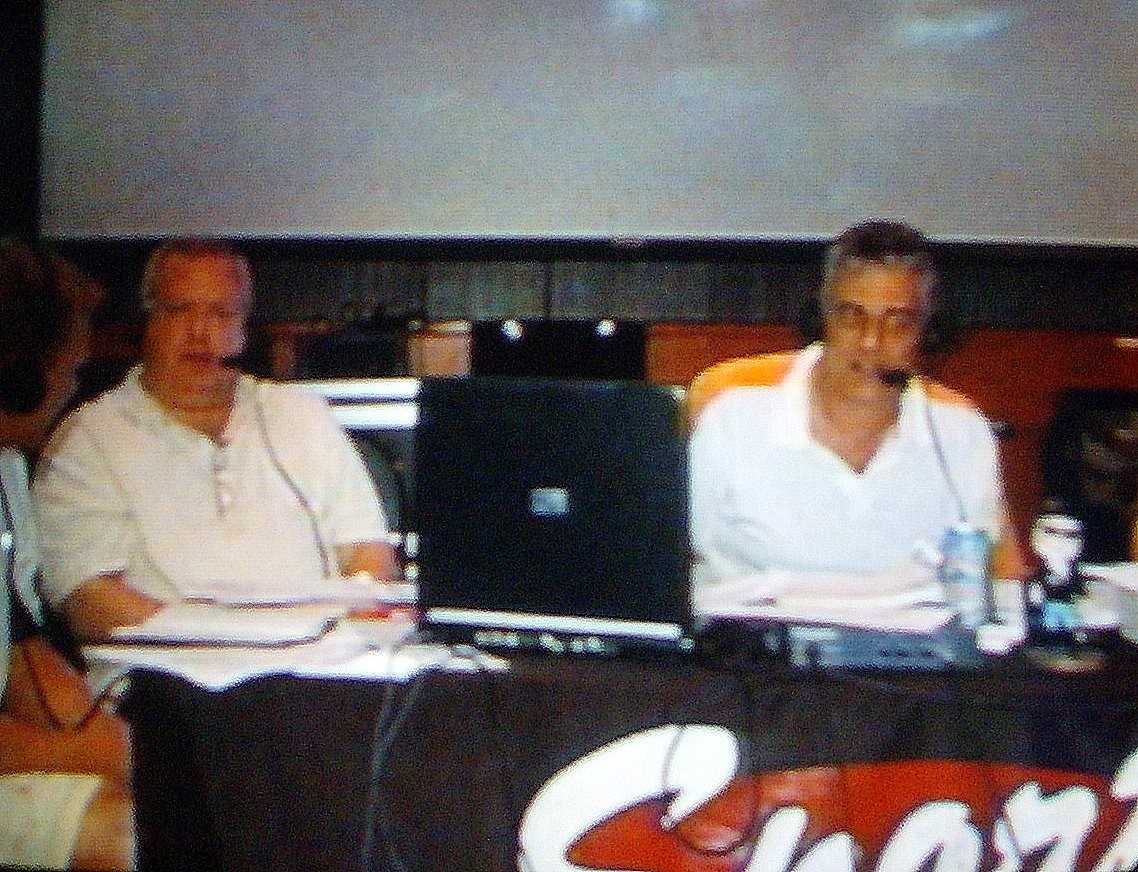
Stoney (right), broadcasting from Radiothon 2007 with Wojo.

In 1994, Stone had applied to become a radio host at the new all-sports radio station WDFN, initially assigned to do the evening show with Ike "Mega Man" Griffin, but was moved to do the afternoon show, The Odd Couple, after sports columnist Rob Parker's co-host bailed at the last second. Parker left for New York after ten months, so the station would hire Detroit News columnist Bob "Wojo" Wojnowski to be Stone's new co-host, thus the Stoney and Wojo show was born in April 1995. The three-hour radio broadcast saw much success with Stone being regarded as a distinct, entertaining straight man, and knowledgeable on-air presence that represented the market. As such, he'd often appear as a guest on national media outlets, including the nationally syndicated Jim Rome Show, to discuss Detroit sports events, which include Malice at the Palace.

The Stoney and Wojo show would kick off an annual 28-hour radiothon to support research for a cure for leukemia and lymphoma in 1998, after discovering that WDFN update reporter Sabrina Black had been diagnosed with lymphoma, and raised over $100,000 in its first year. The radiothon typically took place inside a Metro Detroit restaurant, with many guest appearances including Tony Dungy, Joe Dumars, and many others. After a long battle with her disease, Black died on March 20, 2006. In 2008, the "Sabrina Black Fund" raised as much as $130,000 for The Leukemia and Lymphoma Society of Michigan.

On July 13, 2007, both Stone and Wojnowski were given the opportunity to fill in as guest hosts on The Jim Rome Show.

The three-hour afternoon show would eventually come to an end on January 20, 2009, when Clear Channel decided to gut all of WDFN's local programming for syndicated radio during the first inauguration of Barack Obama, and the time slot was eventually filled by Matt Shepard and Drew Sharp in September 2009.

=== WXYT (2010–present) ===
In 2010, Stone was hired at WXYT-FM to co-host The Morning Show with Bill McAllister, renaming the show to the Stoney and Bill show. During this time, he also had a segment at WXYZ-TV titled Sundays with Stoney.

On September 6, 2016, Jamie Samuelsen was moved from evenings to mornings in order to replace Bill McAllister, renaming the show to the Jamie and Stoney show. Samuelsen would end up being diagnosed with colon cancer and died on August 1, 2020, so the station's studio was then renamed to "The Jamie Samuelsen Studios" in his honor. By October 5, 2020, Samuelsen was replaced by Jon Jansen, renaming the show to the Stoney and Jansen show.

Then on August 23, 2023, it was announced that Stone would step down from his position as full-time morning show host after the 2023 NFL season, set to be replaced by Jim Costa. Stone would air his final show as full-time host on February 16, 2024, but he would remain with the station as a fill-in host for two more years.

== Personal life ==
Stoney is a Jewish man who lives in West Bloomfield, Michigan. He married Cyndi, an occupational therapist, in 1996. He has two twin daughters named Jessica and Marissa.
