= Rob Parker (sports journalist) =

American journalist

- Education: Southern Connecticut State University (BS); Columbia University (MS)
- Occupations: Sports columnist, TV sports anchor

Rob Parker is a former American sports anchor for WXYZ-TV and WMYD and a former contributor to Fox Sports 1's show Skip and Shannon: Undisputed. Prior to that, he was a sports columnist for ClickOnDetroit.com and a regular commentator on WDIV-TV's Sunday night sports show. Parker also formerly served as a sports columnist for The Detroit News.

== Career ==
Parker graduated from Martin Van Buren High School in Queens Village and then received a B.S. in Journalism from Southern Connecticut State University and a Master's degree in Journalism from Columbia University. He currently serves as an adjunct instructor at the Annenberg School of Journalism at the University of Southern California.

=== Print ===
Parker was the first black sports columnist at the Detroit Free Press in 1993 and the first black general sports columnist at Newsday in New York in 1995. He has also written for The Detroit News, Times Leader in Wilkes-Barre, Pennsylvania, the Daily News in New York and The Cincinnati Enquirer.

In 2004, Parker penned a much-maligned column where he called Hank Aaron a "coward" for declining to attend when Barry Bonds would break the career home run record.

In October 2008, Parker erroneously reported that Kirk Cousins, who was then the backup quarterback for the Michigan State Spartans, was involved in a fight with members of the Michigan State hockey team. After being publicly reproved by head coach Mark Dantonio at his weekly news conference, Parker was suspended by The Detroit News for two weeks.

On December 21, 2008, at a press conference following the Lions 42–7 loss to the New Orleans Saints, during the Lions' 0–16 season, Parker caused controversy when he addressed a question at Lions head coach Rod Marinelli about Lions defensive coordinator Joe Barry, Marinelli's son-in-law, inquiring whether Marinelli wished that his daughter had "married a better defensive coordinator." The question was criticized as unprofessional and inappropriate. The next day, Parker wrote that the comment was "an attempt at humor" and not a malicious attack. On January 6, 2009, The Detroit News announced that Parker had resigned from the newspaper the previous week.

=== Radio ===
In 1994, Parker was hired at the new all-sports radio station, WDFN in Detroit, where he co-hosted The Odd Couple with Mike Stone in the afternoon. The show lasted ten months before Parker left to become a sports columnist in New York around May 1995.

Parker would later return to WDFN in 1998, where he co-hosted Parker and the Man in the morning with Mark Wilson. In 1999, the show moved to WKRK-FM's evening time slot, becoming Sports Night with Parker and the Man, which had a successful seven-year run before its cancellation, thus moving to WCHB on April 30, 2007 until a format change on June 9, 2008. Then on March 24, 2014, Parker and The Man made a brief return to WDFN for the station's 20th anniversary.

In September 2018, Parker began hosting Fox Sports Radio's The Odd Couple alongside Chris Broussard. Broussard departed and was replaced by Kelvin Washington in September 2024.

In 2019, Parker signed a deal with Apple for a podcast called Inside the Rob Parker.

In 2024, Parker took control of WXYT in Detroit, through a local marketing agreement with Audacy, and launched Sports Rap Radio on June 4, 2024. The station was intended to be an all-black sports talk and hip-hop station, with plans to expand to regions with a sizable African-American market base. On August 28, 2024, Sports Rap Radio ceased operations after its second round of funding fell through.

=== Television ===
Parker has worked as a contributor to FS1's Skip and Shannon: Undisputed, teaming up again with former debate partner Skip Bayless. He was also a frequent guest on Colin Cowherd's The Herd With Colin Cowherd for television and radio. He has worked at WDIV-TV in Detroit since 1993. Parker was hired on at ESPN in 2003. He was a regular on First Take, where he debated controversial sports topics with Bayless and Stephen A. Smith. He also appeared on ESPN's Numbers Never Lie with Michael Smith. Parker also hosted a TV show called Sports Rap on WADL in Detroit with Detroit Lions safety Ron Rice.

On December 13, 2012, on First Take, Parker made controversial remarks where he questioned the "blackness" of Washington Redskins quarterback Robert Griffin III during a segment discussing Griffin's comment at an earlier press conference that although he was an African-American, he did not want to be defined by that alone. Parker stated, "He's not real. OK, he's black, he kind of does the thing, but he's not really down with the cause. He's not one of us. He's kind of black but he's not really, like, the guy you want to hang out with because he's off to something else." Parker then cited Griffin having a white fiancée and "talk about how he's a Republican" (though he acknowledged having no information to support this). ESPN announced on December 20, 2012, that Parker would be suspended for 30 days. Parker expressed surprise at the reaction to his comments, stating "Looking back on some of the comments, I can see where people could take it out of context and run with it. But the response and what happened over the past 30 days is just shocking." ESPN announced on January 8, 2013, that Parker would not return.

== Personal life ==
Parker is godfather to Nyla Smith, the daughter of Stephen A. Smith.

Parker co-owns a barbershop called Sporty Cutz on Seven Mile Road in Detroit. It was established in October 2002.
