= Doug Karsch =

American sports announcer

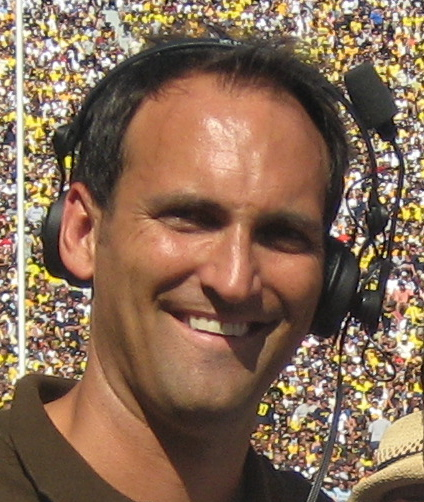
- Karsch in 2008
- Born: 1969 or 1970 (age 56–57); Champaign, Illinois, U.S.
- Education: Michigan State University
- Presenting career
- Show: Radio: Karsch & Anderson; TV: Michigan Sports Weekly; Inside Michigan Football
- Stations: Radio show: WXYT-FM, Detroit, Michigan; Michigan Sports Network (football play by play announcer); TV shows: Syndicated on cable sports channels
- Time slot: 10 am – 2 pm, Monday-Friday (Karsch & Anderson)
- Style: Sports radio
- Country: United States
- Website: www.971theticket.com

Doug Karsch (born 1969 or 1970) is an American talk radio show host and the Michigan Wolverines football radio play by play announcer (alongside Jon Jansen), based in Detroit, Michigan.

== Education and early career ==
Karsch was born in Champaign, Illinois and graduated from Michigan State University with a degree in communications. He got his start in broadcasting at TV station WEYI in Flint as a sports reporter. He made his radio debut in 1994 on WTKA in Ann Arbor. He has hosted pre-game/halftime/post-game coverage of Wolverine basketball. Nationally he has been heard on ESPN College Football Tailgate on ESPN Radio. He has also covered NASCAR and CART races.

== Current roles ==
=== Radio ===
He is the co-host of Karsch & Anderson (formerly the Big Show), a radio talk show heard weekdays on WXYT-FM "97.1 The Ticket" in Detroit, Michigan. Doug also hosted The Brady Hoke Radio Show, a weekly syndicated Michigan Wolverines football discussion program, along with Jim Brandstatter, and varying assistant coaches and players which airs live on Thursdays during the college football season.

He is also the sideline reporter during Michigan football games.

In April 2014 Karsch was said to be among the finalists for the University of Michigan Football play by play radio position. The position was, in the end, awarded to Dan Dierdorf, who played football for Michigan and in the NFL, as well as having done color commentary for NFL games on ABC and CBS.

Beginning in the fall of 2022, Karsch and former Michigan football player Jon Jansen assumed the roles of the new broadcast voices for Michigan Football.

=== Television ===
Karsch also hosts a weekly newsmagazine show for the Michigan Wolverines called Michigan Sports Weekly on the university's Michigan Channel, as well as Fox Sports Detroit and Big Ten Network

He also appears as a reporter on Inside Michigan Football, seen on the same channels.

=== Print ===
In addition to working at WXYT, Karsch has given interviews regarding his opinion of various news items about the Michigan Wolverines football team, that have later been published in The Detroit Free Press. His radio interviews with other athletes, such as one given to him by Dontrelle Willis when he was signed to the Detroit Tigers, have been published in The Detroit Free Press.
