= Mike Valenti =

American radio personality

- Born: October 24, 1980 (age 45); Troy, New York, U.S.
- Education: Michigan State University
- Presenting career
- Show: The Valenti Show
- Stations: WXYT-FM/AM, Detroit, Michigan
- Time slot: 2:00–6:00 p.m., Monday–Friday
- Style: Sports radio/general talk
- Country: United States
- Website: 971theticket.com

Mike Valenti (born October 24, 1980) is a radio commentator based in Detroit, Michigan. He hosts The Mike Valenti Show with Rico (Formerly The Valenti and Foster Show and Sports Inferno) weekday afternoons from 2 p.m. to 6 p.m. on WXYT-FM 97.1. His co-host for 13 years was Terry Foster, who retired in April 2017.

== Career ==
Valenti was born in Troy, New York. In early 2004, Valenti was hired as co-host of The Sports Inferno alongside Terry Foster, mid-days on 1270 WXYT in Detroit.

In March 2009 Valenti caused controversy after reading a couple jokes about Detroit Lions defensive end Corey Smith, who was lost at sea and is presumed dead. Valenti while on air, read a couple distasteful "ticket texts" poking fun at Smith's disappearance. With 97.1 being the team's flagship station, he apologized on air the next day.

Valenti appeared on The Ford Lions Report on Sunday Mornings during the NFL regular season, during pro football fantasy team reports, and the Lions pre game show.

The Lions didn't renew their contract with 97.1 The Ticket for 2016, opting for a 5-year contract with WJR. Valenti's agent, Mort Meisner, reported the Lions wanted Valenti fired in order to renew with 97.1 The Ticket.

"It's absolutely true, 100 percent of it," Mike Valenti said about allegations the Lions left 97.1 The Ticket because they didn't like his criticism of the team.

Valenti was re-signed by 97.1 The Ticket to a multi-year deal in April 2016.

=== The Rant ===
On Monday, September 25, 2006, following a Michigan State University football loss against Notre Dame—a game in which his alma mater blew a sixteen-point fourth-quarter lead—Valenti went off on a twelve-minute on-air tirade ripping into the Spartans for their poor showing. Highlights of the rant featured Valenti saying the Spartans "handed [the game] away like a nice three-button coat at the Salvation Army," that they "choked on applesauce," and his plea to then-head coach John L. Smith to recognize that "timeouts are not like cell phone minutes—they don't carry over!" Valenti also included scathing criticism of offensive coordinator Dave Baldwin's decision to have Drew Stanton "run the option in Hurricane Katrina," and a desire for defensive coordinator Chris Smeland to be replaced by H. R. Pufnstuf with Teddy Ruxpin as his assistant.

The meltdown was covered in an article in Sports Illustrated where it was deemed "the single finest rant ever heard on sports talk radio." The Detroit News called Valenti "absurdly emotional," and Smith responded, saying: "It's kind of laughable, embarrass-able...God bless him. Let him put it on his headstone and rest in peace, I guess."

=== Retirement of Terry Foster ===
Longtime broadcaster Terry Foster announced his retirement from the Valenti & Foster show on April 20, 2017 after over 13 years together. Foster cited the two strokes suffered in 2016 for the sudden retirement.

=== Always Aggravated with Mike Valenti Podcast ===
In November 2018, Valenti announced that he will be debuting the Always Aggravated with Mike Valenti podcast. The debut episode was released on November 14, 2018, and is released weekly on Wednesday mornings.

In August 2019, Valenti introduced another football and gambling focused podcast called Cash the Ticket. After a pause, the Cash the Ticket podcast resumed in 2022 with Valenti joined by co-host Jim Costa.

=== The "Stoney and Wojo Invitational" ===
July 18, 2018, Valenti welcomed other 97.1 The Ticket radio personalities Mike "Stoney" Stone and Bob "Wojo" Wojnowski to do a 64-team bracket style tournament for Valenti Show radio bits and songs. The tournament was held again in 2019, but canceled in 2020 and 2021 due to most of the station’s hosts working from home because of COVID-19. The tournament returned in 2022.

- 2018 Champion - "Let the Bitch Walk" - Terry Foster
- 2019 Champion - "Old Guy Bit" - Mike and Sully
- 2022 Champion - "Dan, That's a Big Ask" - Lomas Brown
- 2023 Champion - "Donald Sterling Impression" - Mike Valenti
- 2024 Champion - “No no no no” - Katt Williams
- 2025 Champion - "I slept in the same bed as my sister" - Mike Stone
- 2026 Champion - "Please refrain from using ethnic slurs." - SNL Celebrity Jeopardy
