= Davey Marlin-Jones =

American theatre director

Davey Marlin-Jones (May 8, 1932 – March 2, 2004) was an American stage director, as well as a local television personality. He was born in Winchester, Indiana, and was known as a tireless advocate for the local stage and theatrical scene in the many places he lived during his long career.

From 1970 to 1987, he was a film and arts critic for WUSA-TV (formerly WTOP and WDVM), the CBS affiliate in Washington, DC. During much of that time, he also performed the same duties for WDIV-TV in Detroit. He was known for his eccentric on-air style in reviewing films and theatre and cultural events. One example of his style was the use of index cards when he reviewed films, and he would keep or throw away the card depending on whether he liked or hated the film. He enunciated with theatrical bravura and often wore large black-rimmed glasses and sometimes sported an Alpine hat.

After John and Hazel Wentworth, founders of the Washington Theater Club, divorced in the 1960s, he and Hazel Wentworth continued the Club's operations. He directed many of its performances. He was awarded the Jerome Lawrence and Robert E. Lee (Robert Edwin Lee) Theatre Research Margo Jones Award in 1968.

Prior to his death, Marlin-Jones was a Professor of Theater and Playwriting for fifteen years at UNLV. In 1997 he won the "Excellence in Theatre Education Award" from the Board of Governors of the Kennedy Center American College Theater Festival. The American College Theater Festival Respondent's Choice Award has been renamed the "Davey Marlin Jones Respondent's Choice Award."

== Philosophy of directing ==
In a twist on classical Aristotelian analysis, Marlin-Jones used the acronym PASTO to break down plays. First published in Kenneth Macgowan's A Primer of Playwriting, the book he considered to be the best ever written on the art of building plays, PASTO stands for:

- Preparation
- Attack
- Struggle
- Turn
- Outcome

PASTO was the foundation of both his personal directing and the play analysis taught to his students at UNLV. PASTO is still used by many of his students today, both in their own work, and in the classes they teach.
