= Jon Jansen =

American football player (born 1976)

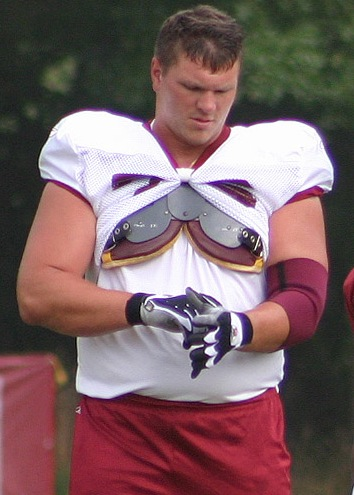
- Jansen with the Washington Redskins in 2005

No. 76, 68
- Position: Offensive tackle

Personal information
- Born: January 28, 1976 (age 50); Oxford, Michigan, U.S.
- Listed height: 6 ft 6 in (1.98 m)
- Listed weight: 290 lb (132 kg)

Career information
- High school: Clawson (Clawson, Michigan)
- College: Michigan (1994–1998)
- NFL draft: 1999: 2nd round, 37th overall pick

Career history
- Washington Redskins (1999–2008); Detroit Lions (2009)

Awards and highlights
- Second-team All-Pro (2005); NFL All-Rookie Team (1999); National champion (1997); First-team All-American (1998); Big Ten Offensive Lineman of the Year (1998); 2× First-team All-Big Ten (1997, 1998)

Career NFL statistics
- Games played: 137
- Games started: 125
- Fumble recoveries: 3
- Stats at Pro Football Reference

Jonathan Ward Jansen (born January 28, 1976) is an American former professional football player who was an offensive tackle in the National Football League (NFL). He played college football for the Michigan Wolverines, and was selected by the Washington Redskins in the second round of the 1999 NFL draft. He also played briefly for the Detroit Lions.

== Early life ==
Jansen earned Prep Football Report All-Midwest and Detroit News Blue Chip honors as a tight end at Clawson High (Mich.). As a senior, he made a school-record 31 catches for 420 yards. He posted 68 career catches and made 202 tackles, four sacks and four interceptions at linebacker to earn Oakland County Defensive MVP honors. He lettered in football, basketball and baseball.

== College career ==
Jansen was a two-time First-team All-Big Ten selection at Michigan. He set a school record with 50 straight starts, all at right tackle, earning the nickname "Rock." As a senior in 1998, he was named a First-team All-American by the Burger King American Football Coaches Association. He paced Michigan's down lineman with 106 knockdowns on an offense that gained 4,955 yards. He helped Michigan to a 45–31 victory over Arkansas in the Citrus Bowl. He was Michigan's co-captain as a senior and junior and fortified an offense that posted 4,652 yards en route to the national championship. As a redshirt freshman, he helped propel an offense that amassed 5,140 yards.

== Professional career ==
=== Washington Redskins ===
Jansen was selected by Washington in the second-round of 1999 NFL draft (37th overall). He was a valuable addition to a Redskins offensive line that allowed 31 sacks compared with a franchise record 61 in 1998. He started all 16 regular-season games and both playoff games. Jansen made a huge impact in mini-camp, training camp and the preseason, impressing coaches with his ability to grasp the Redskins system. He was part of an offensive line that earned game balls for allowing no sacks in a 50–21 win over the Giants in Week 2.

On an offensive line decimated with injuries, Jansen did not miss a snap in 2000. He was one of four players on offense to start each game and has now started every game in his career (34), including two playoff contests. His blocking helped Stephen Davis rush for 1,318 yards.

Jansen started all 16 games for the third straight season in 2001. He has started every game in his career (50, including two playoff games). He earned the game ball, along with the rest of the offensive line, for making way for the offense to rush for a season-high 226 yards in Redskins 27–14 win over Seattle (11/4). He and the unit earned another game ball for their outstanding play in Week 16 after the Redskins beat the Saints 40–10. Jansen's blocking helped running back Stephen Davis eclipse the team record with 1,432 yards rushing, third in the NFL and first in the NFC.

Jansen was voted by his teammates as the 'Unsung Hero' of the Redskins for 2002. He regarded as one of the best tackles in the NFL and part of the best bookend tandem of tackles when paired with Pro Bowler Chris Samuels. A relentless worker, Jansen helped the Redskins offense rush for 1,889 yards.

Jansen started all 16 games in 2003 at right tackle for the fourth straight season, living up to his nickname: "The Rock". He had started 82 straight contests (including 2 playoff games) as a pro after starting 50 straight games in his college career at Michigan. Jansen continued to be a solid performer at right tackle, teaming with new right guard Randy Thomas to open up holes and protect Redskin quarterbacks. In Week 1 vs. New York Jets, he helped open holes for the Redskins to rush for 160 yards. In Week 2 at Atlanta, he helped the Redskins total 435 yards and 125 rushing yards. In Week 3 vs. New York Giants, he helped the Redskins total 456 yards and 124 rushing yards. He continued his rivalry with Pro Bowl defensive end Michael Strahan by limiting him to two tackles and no sacks. In a Week 10 game against Seattle, he helped the Redskins offense compile 379 total yards and 137 rushing yards. In Week 13 game against the New Orleans Saints, he helped the Redskins to 392 total yards and 161 rushing yards, opening holes for Trung Canidate who logged 115 rushing yards.

Jansen suffered a ruptured left Achilles tendon injury in the Redskins' preseason opener on Aug. 9, 2004 against the Denver Broncos. He was placed on the team's injured reserve list shortly after having surgery to repair the injury.

Jansen returned from the Achilles injury in 2004 to start all 16 games and two playoff games in 2005. He joined with right guard Randy Thomas to develop a dominant right side of the offensive line. He also helped running back Clinton Portis rush for a single-season team record 1,516 yards. In Week 1 vs. Chicago, he helped the Redskins' offense rush for 164 yards, led by Clinton Portis's 121 rushing yards on 21 carries. In Week 7 vs. San Francisco, he helped the Redskins' offense rush for 204 yards, led by Clinton Portis's 101 rushing yards and Ladell Betts' 92 yards. In Week 13 at St. Louis, he was part of an offensive line that compiled a season-high 257 rushing yards. Clinton Portis had 136 rushing yards and two touchdowns, while Rock Cartwright had 118 rushing yards on nine carries.

Jansen was given a new contract on February 7, 2007, at the conclusion of the 2006 season.

During the season opener against Miami in 2007, Jansen suffered a season-ending broken and dislocated ankle. He was placed on the injured reserve. Reche Caldwell, a wide receiver, was signed for the roster spot vacated by Jansen.

On May 29, 2009, the Washington Redskins cut Jansen. Jansen was released after a meeting with Redskins owner Daniel Snyder, and head coach Jim Zorn among others.

=== Detroit Lions ===
On May 29, 2009. the Lions agreed to a one-year deal with Jansen. The deal was finalized on June 1, 2009. In Detroit, Jansen served as a backup to Gosder Cherilus. On October 11, 2009, Jansen made his first start for the Lions in a game against the Pittsburgh Steelers. He was re-signed to a one-year, $860,000 deal, the NFL minimum, on March 6, 2010. On September 4, 2010, however, Jansen was released by the Lions as they cut their roster to the NFL-mandated 53 player limit.

== Costas Now ==
In September 2006, Jansen appeared on the HBO show Costas Now where in an interview with Bob Costas he stated that in his estimation between 15 and 20% of the league used illegal performance-enhancing drugs. Jansen stated that the use of illegal substances was on the rise because the use of human growth hormone injections which are not tested for by the NFL.

He later recanted this estimation, saying that he felt 15-to-20 percent was a low amount and not realizing the significant numbers of players that a 15-to-20 percent figure would represent.

== Personal life ==
Jansen has three daughters, Lucy, Ruby and Ellie and two sons, Jack and Teddy. He participated at the NFL Network coverage of the playoff game between Philadelphia Eagles and Minnesota Vikings on January 4, 2009, he interviewed Eagles runningback Brian Westbrook. Jansen now does post game shows for the Detroit Lions on 97.1 The Ticket WXYT-FM on Lions Game day. The Big Ten Network has hired Jon for a variety of roles. On May 30, 2017, Jansen was one of eight new inductees announced for the Michigan Sports Hall of Fame in Detroit. The ceremony took place on September 15, 2017. As of 2018, Jansen has appeared on the weekly Inside Michigan Football TV show, co-hosted by Jim Brandstatter. In October 2020, Jansen joined sports-talk WXYT-FM in Detroit as morning show co-host with Mike "Stoney" Stone and Heather Park. Beginning with the 2022 season, Jansen also started calling the University of Michigan Football games for WXYT-FM alongside fellow radio host, Doug Karsch. In February 2024 following Mike Stone's retirement, Jim Costa replaced Stoney as the host of the morning show.
