= Devin Scillian =

American television journalist, musician and children's author

- Scillian in 2024
- Born: January 11, 1963 (age 63); Fort Riley, Kansas. United States
- Education: University of Kansas
- Occupations: Journalist, country singer, children's author and actor
- Years active: 1985–present
- Employer: WDIV-TV (1995–2024)
- Spouse: Corey Scillian
- Children: 4

Devin Scillian (/ˈskɪliən/ SKIL-ee-ən; born January 11, 1963) is an American musician, children's author, playwright, and retired television journalist .

== Broadcast career ==
While still a student at the University of Kansas, Scillian began his television career at WIBW-TV in Topeka, Kansas. After graduating from the William Allen White School of Journalism at Kansas, Scillian worked from 1985 to 1986 at WAND-TV in Decatur, Illinois. He spent the next three years as the main anchor at KLTV in Tyler, Texas, before moving to KFOR in Oklahoma City in 1989. He joined WDIV as a reporter in 1995, and took an anchor position in 1996. Scillian retired from WDIV on December 13, 2024.

Scillian has appeared as a television journalist in several films, including Scream 4, The Double, and Mooz-lum, as well as a recurring role on The Ellen DeGeneres Show as a news anchor in a "Breaking News" skit. He and his anchor partner Kimberly Gill appear as reporters on Eminem's twelfth studio album, The Death of Slim Shady (Coup de Grâce).

== Books ==
His 22 books include A Is For America (2001), Fibblestax (2000), and Memoirs of a Goldfish (2010). He has co-written two books with his wife, Corey. One Kansas Farmer illustrated by Doug Bowles, was released in 2009. Their previous book, S Is For Sunflower, won the Bill Martin, Jr. Picture Book Award in 2007. His most recent book is Memoirs of a Dog illustrated by Tim Bowers (2024). All of his books are published by Sleeping Bear Press.

== Playwright ==
Scillian's first play, BASTARD, received its world premiere at the Purple Rose Theatre Company in Chelsea, Michigan in the fall of 2026.

== Music ==
Scillian has released four albums of his original country music. He won the Detroit Music Award for Best Country Vocalist in 2018 and Best Country Performer in 2001. He and his band Arizona Son make frequent appearances at summer music festivals. They've opened for the likes of Toby Keith, Reba McEntire and LeAnn Rimes.

== Discography ==
- Argentina (1995)
- Tulsa (2000)
- A is for America (2001)
- Letter from London (2016)

== Publications ==
- Fibblestax (2000)
- A is for America (2001)
- One Nation: America by the Numbers (2002)
- P is for Passport (2003)
- Cosmo's Moon (2003)
- S is for Sooner (2003)
- S is for Sunflower (2004)
- H is for Honor (2006)
- Pappy's Handkerchief (2007)
- Brewster the Rooster (2007)
- One Kansas Farmer: A Kansas Number Book (2009)
- Memoirs of a Goldfish (2010)
- D is for Down Under: An Australia Alphabet (2010)
- Westward Journeys (2013)
- Memoirs of a Hamster (2013)
- Johnny Kaw: A Tall Tale (2013)
- Memoirs of an Elf (2014)
- Memoirs of a Parrot (2016)
- Mistletoe: A Very Confused Christmas (2017)
- Back Roads Country Toads (2019)
- Memoirs of a Tortoise (2020)
- A Parliament of Owls (2022)
- Memoirs of a Dog (2024)

== Stage ==
- BASTARD (2026)

== Filmography ==
- Scream 4 (2011) - Reporter #3
- Mooz-lum (2011) - News broadcaster
- The Double (2011) - Newscaster
- Die Hart 2: Die Harter (2024) - News anchor (uncredited)
