= Bob Wojnowski =

American journalist

- Born: 1961 (age 64–65); Buffalo, New York
- Education: University of Michigan
- Presenting career
- Show: Wojo & Riger
- Stations: WXYT-FM, Detroit, Michigan
- Time slot: 6–8pm
- Style: Sports radio
- Country: United States
- Previous shows: Stoney and Wojo
- Website: Bob Wojnowski's column

Robert Joseph “Wojo" Wojnowski is an American reporter and columnist for The Detroit News and host of a radio show on WXYT-FM in Detroit, Michigan. Wojnowski also appears often on Fox 2 WJBK's Sunday Night Sports Works roundtable.

Wojnowski previously co-hosted the Stoney and Wojo radio show on WDFN. Along with co-host Mike Stone, the Stoney and Wojo show had been a consistent ratings leader for years in the Detroit afternoon drive time slot until it was canceled on January 20, 2009.

== Career ==
The Stoney and Wojo show was a three-hour radio broadcast that included listener call-in segments, regular guests, and current affairs talk slanted towards the Detroit and Michigan sports fan. With Mike Stone and Wojnowski's playful repartee, the show had developed a definite comedic quality with Stone playing straight man to Wojo's more clownish comments. The heart of the show was sports and the breaking news of the Detroit sports market was paramount. Included were interviews, where the professional journalism strengths of both Stone and Wojnowski come to the fore. Occasionally, political news was featured, Governor Jennifer Granholm has appeared several times, for example. Stoney and Wojo conducted an annual 28-hour radiothon in support of research for a cure of leukemia and lymphoma. The event was started when Sabrina Black, WDFN update reporter, was diagnosed with lymphoma, and continued after her long battle with the disease lead to her death in 2006. It was typically held in a Metro Detroit restaurant and includes many regular guest appearances including Tony Dungy and Joe Dumars, among many others.

Stoney and Wojo filled in for Jim Rome on the North American syndicated The Jim Rome Show on July 13, 2007.

On January 20, 2009, due to cutbacks at Clear Channel, the Stoney and Wojo Show was discontinued on WDFN "The Fan" in Detroit.

After making appearances on the Drew and Mike Show on WRIF, Wojo joined the evening drive-time show on WXYT-FM on January 23, 2012, accompanied by fellow WDFN alumnus and Fox 2 roundtable partner Jamie Samuelsen for "The Jamie and Wojo Show". On September 6, 2016, Samuelsen moved to mornings, joining Wojo's former co-host Stoney, and leaving Wojo to run the evening show solo. On June 8, 2017, Kyle "Bogey" Bogenschutz joined Wojo's show.

In addition to his own show, Wojo has a weekly segment on Stoney and Jansen called "Wednesdays with Wojo", the title of which parodies the name of fellow Detroit sports columnist and radio personality Mitch Albom's book Tuesdays with Morrie.

Wojo has a running rivalry with fellow Ticket host Mike Valenti. As Valenti is a graduate of Michigan State University, the two play up the intrastate rivalry between MSU and Wojo's alma mater Michigan.

Wojo is a longtime active member of the Detroit Sports Media Association.

== Wojodamus ==
Wojnowski also predicts final scores of big Detroit sporting events under the name "Wojodamus" (a play on Nostradamus). One of Wojodamus' first predictions was Arizona State's upset of the top ranked Nebraska Cornhuskers during the 1996 college football season. The loss ended Nebraska's 26 game winning streak. Wojodamus correctly predicted the Detroit Pistons' selection of Tayshaun Prince in the 2002 NBA draft and the Detroit Lions' selection of Mike Williams in the 2005 NFL draft. The Wojodamus legend grew as early as 1999 when he went into an on-air trance and predicted the No. 9 nationally ranked Wisconsin Badgers football team would lose to the unranked Cincinnati Bearcats.

On April 9, 2008, Wojodamus correctly predicted the 0–7 Detroit Tigers would win their first game of the 2008 Major League Baseball season against the Boston Red Sox. The Tigers won the game 7–2.

On November 17, 2012 – even before the matchups were announced – Wojodamus correctly predicted Alabama would beat Notre Dame 42–14 in the 2013 BCS National Championship Game.
