= Fred Pletsch =

Fred Pletsch is currently serving as analyst on FSN Detroit's college hockey coverage. Additionally he was commissioner for the Central Collegiate Hockey Association.

In his broadcasting career he also has been the play-by-play announcer for the NHL's Ottawa Senators and the AHL affiliate of the Colorado Avalanche.

He was also the commissioner of the North American Hockey League (junior "A") for three seasons. Pletsch is a longtime active member of the Detroit Sports Broadcasters Association, founded in 1948 by pioneer Tigers announcer Ty Tyson.

Fred Pletsch has four children and lives with his wife Kelly in Michigan. He is the son-in-law of former Buffalo Sabres announcer Ted Darling.
