= Deminski & Doyle =

American talk radio program

- Genre: Talk radio
- Running time: 2:00 pm–7:00 pm
- Country of origin: United States
- Language: English
- Home station: WKXW (1993–1999, 2011–2024); WKRK (1999–2007); WCSX (2008–2010)
- Hosted by: Jeff Deminski; Bill Doyle
- Website: nj1015.com/show/deminski-doyle/

Deminski & Doyle was a weekday talk radio program hosted by Jeff Deminski and Bill Doyle on New Jersey 101.5 FM.

== History ==
=== Origins ===
The show began broadcasting at WKRK-FM, 97.1, Detroit, Michigan, on August 23, 1999, after several years at Trenton, New Jersey station New Jersey 101.5 WKXW, where Deminski and Doyle began their on-air partnership in 1993. Two long-time associates of the show also often appeared on air. Rudy DeSantis, the show's call screener, was often the butt of the hosts' good-natured jokes (along with Nicole Salem, the show's traffic reporter). Rudy is also the lead singer for the Detroit-area rock band, MindCandy. Beaver (whose real name, Bill Tortoriello, was rarely mentioned) was the long-time Executive Producer of the show and often participated in wacky on-air stunts, such as getting drunk on the air or dressing up in costumes (a beaver costume stunt was the source of his nickname). Prior to working at WKRK, Beaver worked with Deminski & Doyle as a phone screener at WKXW in New Jersey.

The show previously aired weekdays from 3PM to 7PM on Live 97.1 Free FM (WKRK) in Detroit, Michigan. Beginning at 3PM on October 1, 2007, 97.1 flipped to an all-sports format (save for D&D) and was rebranded as "Detroit's Sports Powerouse 97.1 FM & 1270 AM" [later rebranded as "97.1 The Ticket"] WKRK-FM changed to WXYT-FM; a simulcast of 1270-WXYT-AM was launched and "D&D" began airing between 6 AM and 10 AM during the morning drive, competing against rival station WRIF's Drew and Mike show. They were unable to come to terms with CBS Radio for a new contract during the following months, and after more than eight years in Detroit, they were not on the air in 2008.

On November 29, 2007, it was reported that their final show on WXYT would be on December 14, 2007, as they look to find "greener pastures." During the December 2, 2007, broadcast, Deminski and Doyle did not implicitly confirm their resignation, but they alluded to the fact that they might not be around forever and that they "had a good run." They denied the reports by their agent, Mike Novak, that they referred to CBS as "Cheap Beyond Suspicion," and that they decided to leave the station due to salary issues.

=== Departure from WXYT ===
The last live broadcast of D&D was on December 7, 2007; their show was put into repeats ("Best-Of") starting on December 10, 2007, a week earlier than the hosts had planned. In a blog interview on December 13, 2007, with former WKRK personality Gregg Henson, Deminski implied that the show would not be returning to WXYT in 2008. On December 18, 2007, Mike Novak, the agent for Deminski and Doyle, reported that "officially, Deminski and Doyle has left the station and they will not be back on the air on CBS in Detroit." All references to Deminski and Doyle have been removed from the WXYT website, including the removal of Bill Doyle's name as a co-host to his weekend video game-themed show, Pwned Radio.

=== WCSX ===
On November 17, 2008, WCSX, 94.7, owned by Greater Media, announced via their website that on January 5 Deminski and Doyle would join the WCSX lineup as the new morning show replacing the long-running "JJ and Lynne Show". They appeared at a New Year's Eve party and at midnight, the first second they could legally be on the air, began broadcasting.

On January 1, 2009, Deminski and Doyle began broadcasting their shown on 94.7 WCSX in the metro Detroit area. Beaver was no longer with the show though both Rudy and Nicole Salem continue their tenure with the broadcast team. Jason Carr, a reporter from Fox 2 Detroit and a long-time friend of the show, joined the show as its sports reporter but was later replaced by Jamie Samuelsen. The show originally aired from 6am-10am but the time slot was reduced to 6am-9am on Monday, April 20, 2009.

At 8:05 am on January 4, 2010, after one year, Deminski & Doyle announced that they would be leaving WCSX. Deminski stated that the station wanted to feature more music during the morning drive shift. Deminski and Doyle were given the option to play music, but decided that they were talk-show hosts and not disc jockeys and were not going to continue on WCSX.

During the month of March 2010, the hosts had been periodically "filling in" with late-night shows on WPHT, a conservative-leaning AM talk station out of Philadelphia. Their shows on WPHT were void of nearly all comedic elements and were much more politically oriented, but despite the leanings of the station, their opinions remained mostly non-partisan.

=== WKXW in New Jersey ===
On June 24, 2011, Deminski announced that starting July 5, 2011, the pair would return to New Jersey 101.5 WKXW for the afternoon drive show from 2-7 PM on weekdays. The duo would continue to occupy the afternoon timeslot until May 2024, when WKXW chose not to renew Bill Doyle's contract. Jeff Deminski remains on the station in the timeslot the team once shared.

== Show content ==
The Deminski and Doyle show is a political, comedy-based talk show that airs from 2 PM to 7 PM on New Jersey 101.5. Topics vary from entertainment news, to local New Jersey issues, to other offbeat news topics, many of those related to internet topics and with relevant content and polls featured on NJ1015.com . Common discussion topics include "Favorite Movies", "Jersey Celebrities", "Best Concerts", and "Best Jersey Shore Activities". The show relies heavily on interaction from callers. Jeff Deminski describes his show as "a radio version of the corner bar, where guys will come in and B.S. with the two guys drinking beers at the end, who would be Bill and me. That's kinda the philosophy we've always had." Interviews are sometimes conducted with comedians, authors, and other individuals of interest to the hosts. Almost all interviews during the history of the show are done live, either in-studio or via telephone.
