= Matt Shepard (sportscaster) =

American sportscaster

- Born: 1964 or 1965 (age 60–61); Farmington Hills, Michigan, U.S.
- Education: Central Michigan University
- Occupation: Sportscaster
- Spouse: Lisa
- Children: 4
- Sports commentary career
- Team: Detroit Tigers (2019–2023)
- Genre: Play-by-play
- Sport: Major League Baseball

Matt Shepard (born 1964 or 1965) is an American sportscaster. Shepard was the television play-by-play announcer for the Detroit Tigers on Bally Sports Detroit from 2019 to 2023. He has also covered professional, collegiate and high school sports on both television and radio in Metro Detroit since the 1990s.

== Early life and education ==
Shepard was born in Farmington Hills, Michigan. He graduated from North Farmington High School in 1983, where he played football and baseball. In 1988, he graduated from Central Michigan University with a degree in broadcasting.

== Career ==
Shepard has served in a variety of roles since being hired by Fox Sports Detroit in 1999. Shepard has done CCHA play-by-play, MHSAA championships (Football & Basketball) play-by-play and fill-in play-by-play for the Pistons and Tigers. He also hosted the Pistons pregame show and the Lions postgame show. He also contributes as a features reporter for the network, and formerly did sports updates at WWJ from 1993 to 2001, and at WDFN for the Jamie & Brady show from 2001 to 2007.

Shepard was the host of the Shep, Shower 'N' Shave sports radio morning show which was syndicated by Michigan Media Network and heard on 1130 WDFN in Detroit, 1660 WQLR in Kalamazoo, and 101.1 WGRY in Northern Michigan (Grayling/Roscommon), and is a sports reporter for Fox Sports Detroit. He is currently the radio announcer for University of Michigan basketball and Eastern Michigan University football. He is also currently the play-by-play announcer for Detroit Lions pre-season games, as well as the host of The Ford Lions Report during the regular season, on the Detroit Lions Television Network. Shepard was the 2018 recipient of the prestigious Ty Tyson Award for Excellence in Sports Broadcasting presented by Detroit Sports Media (formerly Detroit Sports Broadcasters Association).

On January 15, 2019, Shepard was named the play-by-play announcer for the Tigers starting with the 2019 season. Bally Sports announced on October 3, 2023, that Shepard will not be returning for the 2024 season. The Detroit News wrote that Shepherd "never completely clicked" in the Tiger broadcast booth, exacerbated by the poor on-field product that the Tigers fielded during his tenure. In 2023, Shepard's final season, Awful Announcing ranked the Tigers' television booth last among the 30 MLB teams. Under Jason Benetti, Shepard's replacement, the booth rose to 10th in 2024, the Tigers' highest ever placement.

== Personal life ==
Shepard resides in Bloomfield Hills, Michigan, with his wife Lisa and four children.
