= WXYT (AM) =

Radio station in Detroit, Michigan, United States

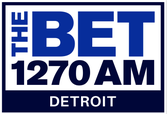
- Detroit, Michigan; United States
- Broadcast area: Metro Detroit
- Frequency: 1270 kHz
- Branding: The Bet Detroit

Programming
- Format: Sports gambling
- Affiliations: BetMGM Network; Westwood One Sports; Central Michigan University Chippewas Football

Ownership
- Owner: Audacy, Inc.; (Audacy License, LLC)
- Sister stations: WDZH; WOMC; WWJ; WXYT-FM; WYCD

History
- First air date: June 3, 1925
- Former call signs: WGHP (1925–1930); WXYZ (1930–1984)
- Call sign meaning: WXYZ Talk radio (disambiguation of former calls)

Technical information
- Licensing authority: FCC
- Facility ID: 28627
- Class: B
- Power: 50,000 watts
- Transmitter coordinates: 42°1′39.16″N 83°20′41.75″W
- Repeater: 97.1 WXYT-FM HD3 (Detroit)

Links
- Public license information: Public file; LMS
- Webcast: Listen live (via Audacy)

WXYT (1270 kHz) is a commercial AM radio station licensed to Detroit, Michigan. It airs a betting-oriented sports radio format known as "The Bet Detroit". Most programming comes from the BetMGM Network and Westwood One Sports. During College football season, WXYT airs live play-by-play from the Central Michigan University Chippewas football team. Owned by Audacy, Inc., the station serves Metro Detroit and much of Southeast Michigan. The studios and offices are on American Drive off 11 Mile Road in Southfield.

WXYT is a Class B station. Despite being on a regional channel, it is powered at 50,000 watts, the maximum for commercial AM stations. To protect other stations on 1270 AM, it uses a directional antenna with a nine-tower array. The transmitter is off Telegraph Road (U.S. Route 24) in Ash Township. WXYT is licensed for HD Radio broadcasting. WXYT is relayed over the third digital subchannel of co-owned 97.1 WXYT-FM.

== History ==
=== WGHP ===
The station was first licensed on June 3, 1925, as WGHP at 110 Rowena Street in Detroit. The call sign was derived from its owner, George Harrison Phelps, an advertising agency owner. It moved to Mt. Clemens in 1927, and moved again to Fraser in 1928. The station was powered at 500 watts.

WGHP was a charter member of the CBS Radio Network, as one of the 16 affiliates that aired the first CBS network program on September 18, 1927. (Note: The other stations were WOR in Newark; WADC in Akron, Ohio; WAIU in Columbus, Ohio; WCAO in Baltimore; WCAU in Philadelphia; WEAN in Providence; WFBL in Syracuse; WJAS in Pittsburgh; WKRC in Cincinnati; WMAK in Buffalo-Lockport; WMAQ in Chicago; WNAC in Boston; WOWO in Fort Wayne, Indiana; KMOX in St. Louis; and KOIL in Council Bluffs, Iowa.)

According to Federal Communications Commission records, a predecessor company to Storer Broadcasting named the "American Broadcasting Company"–unrelated to the later network–owned the station from 1929 until it sold WGHP to the Kunsky-Trendle Broadcasting Company in 1930. Storer would then go on to purchase WJBK in the late 1930s.

=== WXYZ ===
In 1930, the station was purchased by George W. Trendle. He was one of the partners in the Kunsky-Trendle Broadcasting Company. The call sign switched to WXYZ, acquired from a U.S. Army station. WXYZ was powered at 1,000 watts when it moved back to Detroit in 1930. Trendle relocated the station to the Maccabees Building on Woodward Avenue in downtown Detroit, where it maintained facilities until 1959. Antennas and transmitter were located at the northwest corner of Joy and Greenfield Roads in western Detroit. The site was re-developed to a shopping center when the Broadcast House move occurred in 1959. However, most programming in the 1930s, 1940s and early 1950s originated from the former Mendelson Mansion on East Jefferson Avenue.

In addition to local programs, WXYZ produced The Lone Ranger, Challenge of the Yukon and The Green Hornet for broadcast throughout the U.S. and Canada. The station's slogan "The Last Word in Radio" would tie-in with its call letters. Another former slogan was "WXYZ, Where the Best Comes Last".

=== Mutual and NBC Blue Networks ===
On June 1, 1932, WXYZ's affiliation with CBS ended. The trade magazine Broadcasting reported that the reason was "to make way for more local programs". In 1934, WXYZ was one of the founding stations of the Mutual Broadcasting System, along with WOR in New York City, WGN in Chicago, and WLW in Cincinnati.

On September 29, 1935, WXYZ dropped out of the Mutual group to become an affiliate of the NBC Blue Network. The following year, its parent company, Kunsky-Trendle, changed its name to King-Trendle. WXYZ was contractually obligated to provide The Lone Ranger to Mutual for another four years, so although the program originated from WXYZ, it was heard in the Detroit area on Mutual's new affiliate, CKLW in nearby Windsor, Ontario.

Some time prior to the end of 1939, the radio station's power was increased to 5,000 watts daytime. WXYZ increased its night power to 5,000 watts with a mildly directional night pattern by the end of March 1941.

=== ABC ownership ===
On May 3, 1946, the station was purchased by the American Broadcasting Company (ABC), which was recently formed from the NBC Blue Network by Edward Noble. On May 2, 1946, Noble, ABC board chairman, announced the purchase of King-Trendle Broadcasting Corp. (which consisted of WXYZ, WOOD in Grand Rapids and the Michigan Radio Network) for $3,650,000. The sale was approved by FCC on July 18. WXYZ carried ABC's dramas, comedies, news, sports, soap operas, game shows and big band broadcasts during the "Golden Age of Radio".

In 1948, WXYZ personalities contributed to launching programming on ABC's new Detroit television station WXYZ-TV, Channel 7. Also in 1948, WXYZ-FM signed on at 101.1 MHz, which largely simulcast 1270 AM. Dick Osgood of WXYZ radio was the first face on Channel 7 from its studios in the Maccabees Building.

WXYZ had many of Detroit's most prominent radio personalities of the 1940s and 1950s including Dick Osgood, Fred Wolf, Ed McKenzie, Mickey Shorr, "The Lady of Charm" Edyth Fern Melrose, Jack Surrell (one of the earliest African-American air personalities on mainstream radio) and future CBS News correspondents Mike Wallace and Douglas Edwards.

ABC moved WXYZ-AM-FM-TV in 1959 from the Maccabees Building to a new home known as "Broadcast House". WXYZ radio occupied studios on the second floor of the new facility, located at 20777 W. Ten Mile Road in Southfield, Michigan, built on the site of a former farm. It was also the location of WXYZ's AM transmitter until 1984.

=== Top 40 Channel 1270 ===
Over the next decade, as network programming moved to television, WXYZ replaced many of the ABC radio network variety features with local record shows. They were hosted by such personalities as longtime morning show host Fred Wolf, Paul Winter, and Mickey Shorr, one of the most influential of Detroit's early rock and roll disc jockeys.

Under the guidance of Hal Neal, WXYZ was the first ABC owned-and-operated stations to adopt the Top 40 music format in 1958. Although WXYZ had already been making moves toward Top 40 in terms of playing more music and less network programming, the music played on the station during the various disc jockey shows encompassed a wide variety of genres, from Top 40 hits to middle of the road to show tunes to adult standards. The transition to Top 40 was completed in 1958 with the station instituting an official playlist and taking away disc jockeys' privileges to play what they wanted. Although many of the DJs were disenchanted with the changes (particularly Fred Wolf, who was notable for his distaste for rock and roll), WXYZ's move proved a success in terms of ratings. The station's popularity inspired ABC to convert two of its owned-and-operated stations, WABC in New York and WLS in Chicago, to Top 40 in 1960. Neal himself moved to New York to manage network flagship 770 WABC, which during the 1960s became the nation's most listened-to radio station. WXYZ was still, however, as an ABC network station, obliged to carry ABC's weekday morning variety show, "The Breakfast Club" as well as several ABC news shows.

During the late 1950s and early 1960s, "Channel 1270", or "Wixie" (also spelled "Wyxie") as it was affectionately known, battled with Storer Broadcasting's WJBK (1500 AM) and RKO General's CKLW (800 AM) for the Top 40 audience in Detroit.

Some noteworthy personalities during WXYZ's Top 40 era included: longtime morning drive host Fred Wolf; Lee Alan "On The Horn"; Joel Sebastian, (who later moved on to WLS); Paul Winter; Fred Weiss; Dave Prince; Steve Lundy, Don Zee; and, for a short time in 1966, Joey Reynolds and Jim Hampton.

In 1963, WXYZ, WJBK and CKLW were the dominant Top 40 music stations in Detroit. However, both stations saw their ratings impacted by the launch of WKNR "Keener 13" at 1310 on the dial. "Keener" had a tighter, faster presentation and a shorter playlist than the competition, and quickly took over as Detroit's number one rated station. WJBK was the first of WKNR's competitors to fall, switching to a middle of the road (MOR) format in 1964.

=== Adult contemporary ===
WXYZ battled for Top 40 listeners for over three years, but by the summer of 1966, WXYZ had fallen behind CKLW in the ratings. As an ABC-owned-and-operated station, WXYZ continued to be hurt by its ABC network commitments such as "The Breakfast Club" and an hour-long block of news and commentary during the evening drive period. Although the disc jockeys continued to lobby to drop these programs to compete more effectively with WKNR, the network wanted to keep its shows on WXYZ. In early 1967, WXYZ was third-ranked out of the three Top 40 stations. As a result, the station changed direction, softening its music mix to an Adult Contemporary and Middle of the Road (MOR) approach known as "The Sound of the Good Life".

However, the station continued to flounder until Dick Purtan, formerly of WKNR, took over the WXYZ morning show after a short time at WBAL in Baltimore. With Dick Purtan in the morning, WXYZ did respectably in the ratings through the 1970s using an Adult Top 40-Oldies hybrid. In the mid-1970s, WXYZ adopted the "Musicradio" slogan used by its sister stations WABC and WLS and continued to do well with an adult contemporary format and Purtan's morning show as the anchor. By then, the former WXYZ-FM was known as WRIF and was also successful with its "Rock 'N' Stereo 101" album-oriented rock (AOR) sound.

=== Talkradio 1270 ===
WXYZ dropped music in favor of an all-talk format in 1978, which was the same year Dick Purtan left for CKLW. The station started using the moniker "Talkradio 1270". Ron Cameron, Joel Zelle, Tom Hopkins, Tom Dean, Dr. Sonya Freidman and David Newman hosted talk shows during this time, under Program Directors Bob Oakes and Michael Packer. News reporters and anchors included Tom Bell, Tom Adams, Lou Hebert, Kathy Jackson, Robert Lambert, Scott Lewis and Mike O'Neill. In 1977, WXYZ reporters Lou Hebert and Tom Adams won a radio Peabody Award for Winter's Fear: The Children, The Killer, The Search, a presentation on the events surrounding the Oakland County Child Killer case.

WXYT logo, used until switching to sports talk in 2001

In 1984, the radio station was seeing its profits steadily declining along with its ratings. Station vice president and general manager Chuck Fritz, thinking he could operate it more profitably, offered to buy the station. ABC agreed and sold it to Fritz Broadcasting for $3 million. The call letters were changed to the similar-sounding WXYT, with the "T" standing for "talk". The WXYZ call letters were retained by the TV station, which was sold two years later to Scripps-Howard to comply with divestiture requirements following Capital Cities Communications' purchase of ABC. WRIF was also sold while Capital Cities retained WJR, WHYT, The Oakland Press and its cable television interests in Southeastern Lower Michigan. Jock Fritz later bought the struggling 92.3 FM and converted it to the successful WMXD "Mix 92.3" (now an iHeartMedia station), and founded the Radio Station Representative Association in Detroit.

WXYT continued with its talk format as "Talkradio 1270", airing local programs hosted by Denny McLain, Kevin Joyce, Bill Bonds, Mark Scott, David Newman, John McCullogh and weathercaster Rob Kress. It also carried syndicated talk show hosts such as Don Imus, Larry King, Michael Jackson, and Rush Limbaugh. Glenn Haege, known as "America's Master Handyman", hosted "Ask The Handyman", a weekend home improvement show that started on WXYZ in the mid-1980s, and lasted on WXYT until 2002. In 1998, after an unsuccessful campaign for Michigan governor, Geoffrey Fieger hosted an evening talk show that lasted less than a year.

In 1994, the station was sold again, this time to Infinity Broadcasting, which itself was acquired by CBS Radio in 1997. The CBS merger paired WXYT with WWJ and WKRK-FM.

=== The Sports Station ===
WXYT changed to an all-sports format in 2000. The station had already possessed the rights to air Detroit Lions football since 1998, and acquired the broadcast rights to Detroit Tigers baseball and Detroit Red Wings hockey from rival station WJR. WXYT re-branded itself as "Team 1270".

By 2002, WXYT re-branded itself again, this time as "AM 1270 The Sports Station". Power was increased from 5,000 watts to 50,000 watts, though with a highly directional signal, as opposed to non-directional clear-channel 50,000 watt WJR. In 2005, WXYT re-branded again, this time to "1270-XYT: The Sports Station".

In the early 2000s, WXYT's afternoon show, The Locker Room, was hosted by former Detroit Tiger Kirk Gibson, Gary Danielson and former WJBK-TV and WABC-TV sports anchor Eli Zaret. Until the 2006 NCAA college football season, WXYT was the broadcast home for the Michigan State University Spartans. Opie and Anthony, upon the return of their show, The Opie and Anthony Show, were also on WXYT from June to September 2006, after WXYT's local morning sports talk programming experiment fell through. Their show was moved to sister station WKRK, while WXYT picked up Mike and Mike in the Morning from ESPN Radio. In August 2007, WXYT became an ESPN Radio affiliate, same as its Detroit sports radio competitor, WDFN. The two stations briefly simulcast ESPN content until the merger of WXYT with WKRK-FM in October 2007, at which point WXYT picked up WKRK's affiliation with Sporting News Radio while dropping ESPN.

WXYT aired one-minute sports news updates, called "Sports Headlines", at the top of every hour, as well as a quick update at the bottom of the hour on weekends and from 3-9 p.m. Monday thru Friday. This was unlike many other sports stations across the country which air their sports news updates three times an hour.

In January 2007, WXYT announced that it had renewed its flagship-broadcast contracts with the Tigers and Red Wings. Beginning with the 2007 season, the Tigers also had their games simulcast on WKRK-FM. The Red Wings' simulcast began in spring 2007. These contracts were extended in July 2010.

=== Detroit's Sports Powerhouse/The Ticket ===
On October 1, 2007, WXYT began a simulcast with FM sister station WKRK, which dropped its hot talk format in the process. Mike and Mike in the Morning was replaced by Deminski & Doyle, and the ESPN Radio affiliation was dropped in favor of Sporting News Radio. The AM/FM simulcast took the name "Detroit's Sports Powerhouse: 97.1 FM & 1270 AM".

On November 6, the simulcast was renamed "97.1 The Ticket". WKRK took the call letters WXYT-FM in the process. The only mention of the 1270 facility came during the top of the hour legal station identification. Another change was the names of the midday show to "The Big Show" and the afternoon show switched from "The Sports Inferno" to the last names of the hosts.

Along with WXYT-FM, WXYT served as the flagship station for the Detroit Lions, Detroit Red Wings, and the Detroit Tigers. WXYT-AM-FM also shared with WWJ broadcasts of the Detroit Pistons. It also carried syndicated programming from the Los Angeles–based Yahoo! Sports Radio, as well as live (non-Detroit) NFL games from across the country via NFL on Westwood One. In February 2009, the station announced it would broadcast games for the Detroit Pistons, beginning with the 2009-2010 NBA season. All of these play-by-play rights remain with WXYT-FM to this day.

When 1270 was not simulcasting 97.1 FM (mostly during live sporting events with restricted contracts), 1270 used a different set of station IDs.

=== End of simulcast ===
WXYT AM and FM concluded their simulcast on September 12, 2011. The AM 1270 facility reverted to a talk radio format and its former "Talk Radio 1270 WXYT" branding. Charlie Langton hosted a live, local morning show. Doc Thompson (formerly of WMJI in Cleveland, WLW in Cincinnati and WRVA in Richmond) hosted a local afternoon show. Syndicated hosts included Glenn Beck, Laura Ingraham, Todd Schnitt, Rusty Humphries and Coast to Coast AM with George Noory. The station also had frequent preemptions of talk shows to air college and professional games, as well as overflow from WXYT-FM.

Former logo (2012–2015)

In 2012, all CBS-owned radio stations in Detroit moved their operations to the former Panasonic building on American Drive in Southfield.

=== Return to sports ===
Former logo (2015–2021)

On January 2, 2013, AM 1270 returned to sports talk. While WXYT-FM aired mostly local shows, WXYT (AM) largely carried network programming from co-owned CBS Sports Radio.

On February 2, 2017, CBS Radio announced it would merge with Entercom. The merger was approved on November 9, 2017, and was consummated on November 17.

On June 21, 2021, WXYT began integrating sports gambling shows into its line-up and rebranded as "The Bet Detroit". It added programming from the co-owned BetQL Network, with CBS Sports Radio shows remaining in late nights, early mornings and weekend hours.

=== Sports Rap Radio ===
On February 23, 2024, it was announced Audacy would turn over operation of the station via a local marketing agreement to noted sports journalist Rob Parker, who had started his career in Detroit working at the Detroit Free Press, then becoming one of the first voices on the sports talk format of WDFN upon its launch in 1994; he had also worked with other local stations such as WXYT-FM and WCHB. Upon his takeover of control, the station's format was relaunched as "Sports Rap Radio", with Parker intending it to be the flagship station of a format he intended to broadcast in markets with a large African-American market base. His partners in the new format included former NBA player B.J. Armstrong as well as former college athletes Dave Kenney and Maurice Ways. The new format featured a predominantly African-American staff consisting of upcoming journalists or former athletes with a tie to Detroit itself, and featured 12 hours of local programming from 7 a.m. to 7 p.m., with Parker's Fox Sports Radio show The Odd Couple (airing from 7–10 p.m.), which he cohosts with Chris Broussard. The station continued to broadcast from the Audacy Detroit studios and carry overflow programming from WXYT-FM, but had its own sales team.

BetQL Network programming was moved over to WXYT-FM's HD3 channel at midnight on June 3, and WXYT AM began stunting for its upcoming launch. Sports Rap Radio launched on June 4.

=== Sports betting ===
Sports Rap would cease operations at 5 p.m. on August 27, after failing to obtain a second round of funding; Audacy then restored "The Bet Detroit" programming to WXYT. The network took the new moniker of BetMGM Network on February 2, 2025, after Audacy partnered with BetMGM for branding rights to the network.

== See also ==
- Media in Detroit
