= Michigan Channel =

Ann Arbor, Michigan
- Channels: Analog: cable 22

Programming
- Affiliations: PBS

Ownership
- Owner: University of Michigan (Michigan Public Media)

Links
- Website: www.michiganchannel.umich.edu

Michigan Channel is an Educational-access television, Government-access television (GATV) and public affairs cable television channel based in Ann Arbor, Michigan, owned and operated by the University of Michigan, as part of the "Michigan Public Media" unit. The channel is available on cable channel 22 on the Comcast and University of Michigan cable systems in Ann Arbor, Ypsilanti and east-central Washtenaw County (except Saline and Dexter).

Programming on Michigan Channel includes telecourses and lectures aimed at U of M students, plus programming about Michigan government, as well as Public Broadcasting Service (PBS) PBS NewsHour, news from BBC World, and Deutsche Welle's European Journal.
