= WDIV-TV =

Television station in Detroit

- Detroit, Michigan; United States
- Channels: Digital: 32 (UHF); Virtual: 4
- Branding: Local 4; MeTV Detroit (4.3)

Programming
- Affiliations: 4.1: NBC; for others, see § Subchannels

Ownership
- Owner: Graham Media Group; (Graham Media Group, Michigan, Inc.)

History
- Founded: October 23, 1946
- First air date: March 4, 1947
- Former call signs: WWDT (1946–1947); WWJ-TV (1947–1978)
- Former channel numbers: Analog: 4 (VHF, 1947–2009); Digital: 45 (UHF, 1999–2020)
- Former affiliations: Both secondary: DuMont (1947–1948); Paramount (1953–1955)
- Call sign meaning: "We're Detroit's Channel IV" (Roman numeral 4) or "Where Detroit Is Vital"

Technical information
- Licensing authority: FCC
- Facility ID: 53114
- ERP: 720 kW
- HAAT: 307.3 m (1,008 ft)
- Transmitter coordinates: 42°28′58″N 83°12′19″W

Links
- Public license information: Public file; LMS
- Website: clickondetroit.com

WDIV-TV (channel 4), branded as Local 4, is a television station in Detroit, Michigan, United States, affiliated with NBC. It serves as the flagship broadcast property of the Graham Media Group subsidiary of Graham Holdings Company. WDIV-TV maintains studio facilities on West Lafayette Boulevard in Detroit, making it the only major television station in the market with offices and studios within the Detroit city limits. Detroit's other television stations are all based in the suburb of Southfield; WDIV's transmitter is, however, located on Greenfield Road in Southfield.

== History ==
=== Early history ===
The station first signed on the air as WWDT on October 23, 1946, for one day of demonstrative programming; regular programming commenced on March 4, 1947. It was the first television station in Michigan and the tenth station to sign on in the United States overall. The station was originally owned by the Evening News Association, parent company of The Detroit News, along with WWJ radio (AM 950 and FM 97.1, later WXYT-FM). On May 15, 1947, the television station changed its call letters to WWJ-TV to match its radio sisters. Channel 4 has always been an NBC affiliate owing to WWJ radio's longtime affiliation with the NBC Radio Network, but also aired some programs from the DuMont Television Network prior to WJBK-TV (channel 2)'s sign-on in October 1948.

Channel 4 had a number of broadcasting firsts in Michigan including the first telecast of Detroit Tigers, Red Wings and Lions games as well as the state's first televised newscasts. The station's studios were originally located at 600 West Lafayette, across the street from the Detroit News building in downtown Detroit (and next door to its modern studio location). In 1954, the station moved its 1,004-foot (306 m) transmitter from the Penobscot Building in Downtown Detroit to the intersection of Greenfield and Lincoln roads in Southfield. Network programming was broadcast in color starting in 1954. The station began broadcasting its newscasts and other locally produced programs in color in 1960, when it purchased new studio camera equipment.

Over the years, the Evening News Association acquired several other broadcasting outlets, such as KTVY in Oklahoma City, KOLD-TV in Tucson, Arizona, and WALA-TV in Mobile, Alabama. Eventually, the Evening News Association created Universal Communications Corporation as a holding company for its broadcasting interests, with WWJ-AM-FM-TV as the flagship stations.

=== Trade to The Washington Post Company ===
In 1969, the Federal Communications Commission (FCC) began to impose restrictions on the common ownership of print and broadcast media in the same market. The combination of the Detroit News and WWJ-AM-FM-TV was given grandfathered protection from the new regulations, but by the mid-to-late 1970s, the Evening News Association was under pressure to break up its Detroit cluster voluntarily. Fearing that an FCC-forced divestiture was imminent, the Evening News Association agreed to trade WWJ-TV to the Washington Post Company in return for that company's flagship station, WTOP-TV. On July 22, 1978, due to an FCC regulation in place at the time that forbade TV and radio stations in the same market but with different ownership groups from sharing the same call signs, channel 4 changed its call letters to WDIV-TV, for "Detroit's IV" (representing the Roman numeral for 4). Additionally, in a series of promotional announcements with news anchor Dwayne X. Riley, the new call letters were said to represent the phrase, "Where Detroit Is Vital". The WWJ-TV call sign was later adopted for use by the former WGPR-TV (channel 62) after its 1995 purchase by CBS, which had acquired WWJ radio in 1989 (CBS sold off its radio unit in 2017); this WWJ-TV is a separate entity not related to WDIV.

Ultimately, the FCC never imposed any limitations on ownership of television stations and newspapers in the same market and the exchange of stations between the Evening News Association (eventually subsumed by the Gannett Company in 1985 and later known as Tegna following the split of the Gannett Company in 2015) and The Washington Post Company (which was renamed Graham Holdings Company following the sale of The Washington Post in 2013) became somewhat unusual in television broadcasting.

In 1982, WDIV moved out of its facility (which had been built in 1936 for WWJ radio and expanded in 1948, and is named the Walker-Roehrig Building) adjacent to the headquarters of the Detroit News and moved one block to its modern broadcast facility at West Lafayette Boulevard. The building has also housed the headquarters of Graham Media Group since 1997; the "Local" branding used by most of the group's stations began at WDIV alongside its acquiring of flagship status in 2000. The station later became available outside the Detroit market when it was selected for inclusion on many Canadian cable providers in the late 1980s and early 1990s. WDIV's signal has been uplinked on C-band satellite since at least 1988. In 2004, the station bolstered local programming by securing broadcast rights to several Detroit Pistons basketball games (Fox Sports Detroit—now called FanDuel Sports Network Detroit—became the Pistons' sole broadcaster in 2008) as well as returning as the host television station for the North American International Auto Show. The station airs the auto show's charity preview, America's Thanksgiving Parade (both in high definition), the Ford Fireworks on the Detroit International Riverfront, and the charity event "The Hob-Nobble Gobble" which is held the Friday before the week of Thanksgiving.

On April 15, 2005, former WDIV employee John Owens was shot in the station's lobby by Epifanio Rivas Jr., a man with a history of harassing WDIV employees. Rivas was charged with attempted murder, while Owens remained in the hospital in critical but stable condition. On November 21, 2006, Wayne County Circuit Court Judge James Callahan sentenced Rivas to 16 to 32 years in prison for the shooting; he was also sentenced to two years for a felony firearm conviction. In December 2008, WDIV began streaming its newscasts online as part of a redesign of the station's website. On June 21, 2010, The 52nd Annual Target Fireworks were produced and aired entirely in high definition. On August 6, 2010, WDIV-TV and WXYZ-TV (channel 7) became the first stations in Detroit to offer Mobile DTV feeds.

On the evening of April 14, 2011, a suitcase containing a suspected improvised explosive device was left in the WDIV studio lobby after the person who planted the device was denied entry by the station's security guard, prompting the Detroit Police Bomb Squad to evacuate the studio as well as the Doubletree Hotel across the street. That night's 11 p.m. newscast was broadcast from the corner of Lafayette and Howard streets; the evacuation resulted in master control operations being inaccessible, preventing the broadcast or editing of news stories, and the broadcast of commercials. The station's virtual channel temporarily reverted to 45.1 (the station's physical digital channel), with HD content downconverted to 720p. The device was detonated minutes later, with police giving the all-clear at 11:15 p.m. for the news crew to re-enter the studio.

Upon re-entering the studio, anchor Devin Scillian explained that WDIV has a policy of not immediately reporting bomb threats unless there is a true threat of an explosion or loss of life. However, because staff was barred access into the studio for the 11 p.m. newscast, an explanation as to why they were on the street, broadcasting from the station's mobile truck instead of the studio, needed to be given. The news was first reported by the Twitter and Facebook accounts of WDIV's news staff; WJBK, WXYZ-TV and WMYD (channel 20) reported on the situation while during the lockout, before the WDIV mobile truck could return to the studios from its assignments. A sweater and some empty soda cans were later found in the briefcase which was left by a homeless man that had followed a WDIV employee in for warmth and coffee; the man was brought to Detroit Receiving Hospital for observation the next day. The Detroit Police Department and Post-Newsweek's management said that no charges would be filed, calling it "just a big misunderstanding".

== Programming ==
WDIV-TV is one of the few television stations in the United States to have aired Wheel of Fortune and Jeopardy! from the beginning of their respective syndication runs in 1983 and 1984. Because of this, the programs did not air on CBC owned-and-operated station CBET-DT in Windsor during the years the Canadian network carried the game shows; they were removed from the CBC schedule in 2012.

=== Programming preemptions ===
In the 1970s and 1980s, WDIV preempted one to two hours of NBC's daytime programming every day. The station also refused to air Late Night with David Letterman and its successor, Late Night with Conan O'Brien at 12:35 a.m. for many years, and during the 1983-84 season, it had preempted the program altogether in favor of the short-lived syndicated talk show Thicke of the Night. That season, the series (and Friday Night Videos) briefly aired on then-independent station WKBD, but that station's airings of the show failed to draw an audience and the shows were dropped in January 1984. By August 1984, they were restored to the WDIV lineup, but prior to 1999, rather than clear them at the network-designated timeslot, the station opted to use it for rebroadcasts of off-network syndicated programs such as Barney Miller, and, by the late 1990s, The Jenny Jones Show.

The station, as WWJ-TV, also refused to clear Saturday Night Live during its first three seasons because of a desire to run selections from a package of feature films it had purchased a few months before the program debuted. The station had offered to tape the series for airing after the film, arguing that the show's audience was of the kind likely to stay up that late, but NBC refused to grant the station permission to do so. The preemptions did not go unnoticed among the show's cast and crew; original cast member Gilda Radner, who was born and raised in Detroit, lamented to the Chicago Tribune that the preemption "breaks my heart. I finally get a job and I'm so excited about it and my family has to go to Bay City to watch it. I wanted all those guys who never asked me for a date to see me too." WKBD, then among the local independents in Detroit, decided to clear the program instead beginning on June 12, 1976. For a brief period in the 1977-78 season, WWJ-TV also dropped The Tomorrow Show, also due to a desire to make use of its film package, with that program also moving to WKBD during that time. The programs were restored to the schedule of channel 4 after its acquisition by the Washington Post Company.

During the 1978–79 season, it aired This Morning, a locally based talk show hosted by Cathie Mann, in place of the game shows Card Sharks and All Star Secrets, while for many years, NBC's 12:30 p.m. programming was preempted in favor of a newscast. During the 1983–84 season, the newscast was expanded to an hour, preempting NBC's noon programming (most notably Super Password). That season, WDIV also preempted the 1983 revival of Dream House in favor of the much more popular syndicated game show Tic-Tac-Dough.

From its debut until September 9, 2022, WDIV has also delayed the fourth hour of Today (which nationally airs at 10 am), airing it generally at 11 am, save for a period from 2013 to 2015 when it aired at 2 p.m. after the launch their own local talk show Live in the D. In its place, WDIV has aired The Ellen DeGeneres Show, The Ricki Lake Show and Rachael Ray at 10 am, with Live in the D airing in that timeslot.

The station did not carry NBC's late night rerun of the fourth hour of Today until 2019, preferring to carry an encore of the 11 p.m. newscast, paid programming, and a second run of Inside Edition. The Today encore was dropped sometime during the COVID-19 pandemic, returning to the previous schedule. Along with all other Post-Newsweek stations, WDIV refused to air any of NBC's televised poker programming, including Poker After Dark, the National Heads-Up Poker Championship and Face the Ace.

From 1999 to 2002, WDIV did not clear the soap opera Passions at 2 p.m. Instead, it aired on WADL (channel 38) at noon on a day-behind basis, while WDIV aired daytime talk shows at 2 p.m.; Houston sister station KPRC-TV did this as well until August 30, 2004, when it became the last NBC station to carry Passions at 2 p.m. These two stations were the only NBC affiliate holdouts to the show; the issue was rendered moot when NBC canceled the soap opera in 2007. WDIV, KPRC-TV and Bonneville International–owned NBC affiliate KSL-TV in Salt Lake City also never carried Sunset Beach; the soap was seen, respectively, on WKBD, KTXH and KOOG (at the time, the former two were UPN affiliates and the latter was a WB affiliate).

NBC programming is preempted for special events, including the annual Ford Fireworks and America's Thanksgiving Parade (whose coverage preempts the live Macy's Thanksgiving Day Parade broadcast on the station, the latter's afternoon rebroadcast is additionally preempted with Graham-produced filler programs, syndicated shows, and infomercials). On most national holidays, scheduled programming is typically preempted, aside from sports and select NBC prime time programming such as movies or specials.

=== Local programs and personalities ===
WDIV was the launching pad for several locally produced shows that went national. The station broadcast the talk show Sonya (hosted by Dr. Sonya Friedman) live at 4 p.m. It was so popular that the station under the banner of Post-Newsweek Stations, syndicated it on a delayed basis to USA Network (which is now co-owned with NBC under NBCUniversal). WDIV also produced the afternoon variety show The Tony Orlando Show at 4 p.m. However, the station's management canceled the program after one year to run the syndicated daytime talk show The Jenny Jones Show.

WDIV later signed WOMC (104.3 FM) morning radio host Dick Purtan to perform live segments during a 4–5 p.m. comedy block called Purtan's People. It was followed by WOMC's Tom Ryan with a monthly special that showed B-movies with comedy skits (in which Ryan played a character known as Count Scary). This was during the heyday of NBC's late-night success Second City Television and Joe Flaherty's Count Floyd. Eventually, Count Scary was dropped by WDIV and moved on to WKBD-TV (channel 50)'s Shocktoberfest. One local program idea that almost cost the station was for a Detroit-based comedy-drama called Hamtramck which aired only once. It created a storm of controversy with the Hamtramck/Polish American community. The program's executive producer, Alan Frank, apologized to the community.

Meteorologist Chuck Gaidica hosted the Michigan Lottery's game shows and his own show. Sports director Bernie Smilovitz also hosted a couple of shows including The Chuck and Bernie Show in which featured then Detroit Pistons coach Chuck Daly, and The Sparky and Bernie Show with Detroit Tigers manager Sparky Anderson. Smilovitz also hosted Bernie's Bloopers/Weekend at Bernie's bloopers specials.

=== Sports ===
WDIV was the over-the-air television flagship station of the Detroit Tigers, a relationship that lasted twenty seasons, from 1975 to 1994, and previously from 1947 to 1952. During the majority of WDIV's second tenure as the Tigers' broadcast outlet, Hall of Famers George Kell and Al Kaline served as play-by-play announcer and color analyst, respectively, on the telecasts. Bernie Smiltovitz hosted the station's pregame show, Tigers 'XX ('84, '85, etc.) during most of WDIV's time as the TV home of the Tigers. As a result of the station's carriage of Tigers games (which usually ranged between 40 and 50 telecasts per season, the majority of them on weekends), WDIV preempted or rescheduled any affected NBC programming that was displaced. The station also carried any Tigers games when they were featured nationally as part of NBC's MLB coverage from its 1947 sign-on until 1989; this included World Series victories in 1968 and 1984.

WDIV and WDWB/WMYD shared the over-the-air broadcast rights to the Detroit Pistons, from 2004 to 2008. After the 2007–08 season, the Pistons' local telecasts became exclusive to Fox Sports Detroit. As the co-flagship of the Pistons' television network, WDIV was the local outlet that televised the "Malice in the Palace" between the Pistons and the Indiana Pacers on the night of November 19, 2004, which led to the most infamous brawl in NBA history near that game's conclusion; the station also aired any Pistons games via NBC's broadcast contract with the NBA from 1990 to 2002, and will do so again with the start of the 2025–26 season.

The station has also carried the NFL's Detroit Lions, but not as an "official station" partner where it broadcast pre-season and team programming. From 1970 to 1997, via NBC's broadcast contract with the American Football Conference, home interconference contests were aired on channel 4 (which included the Thanksgiving games in some years). Since 2006, Lions games are shown on the station as part of NBC's Sunday Night Football package.

Additionally, through NBC's broadcast contract with the NHL, Detroit Red Wings games were carried until the deal's end in 2021, including the team's winning run through the 2008 Stanley Cup Finals as well as the team's appearance in the 2009 Stanley Cup Finals, though it often had to compete with CBC Television's CBET-DT across the river in Windsor, which also carries NHL playoff coverage.

Since 2023, the station has carried select Michigan Wolverines football games through NBC's broadcast contract with the Big Ten Conference.

=== News operation ===
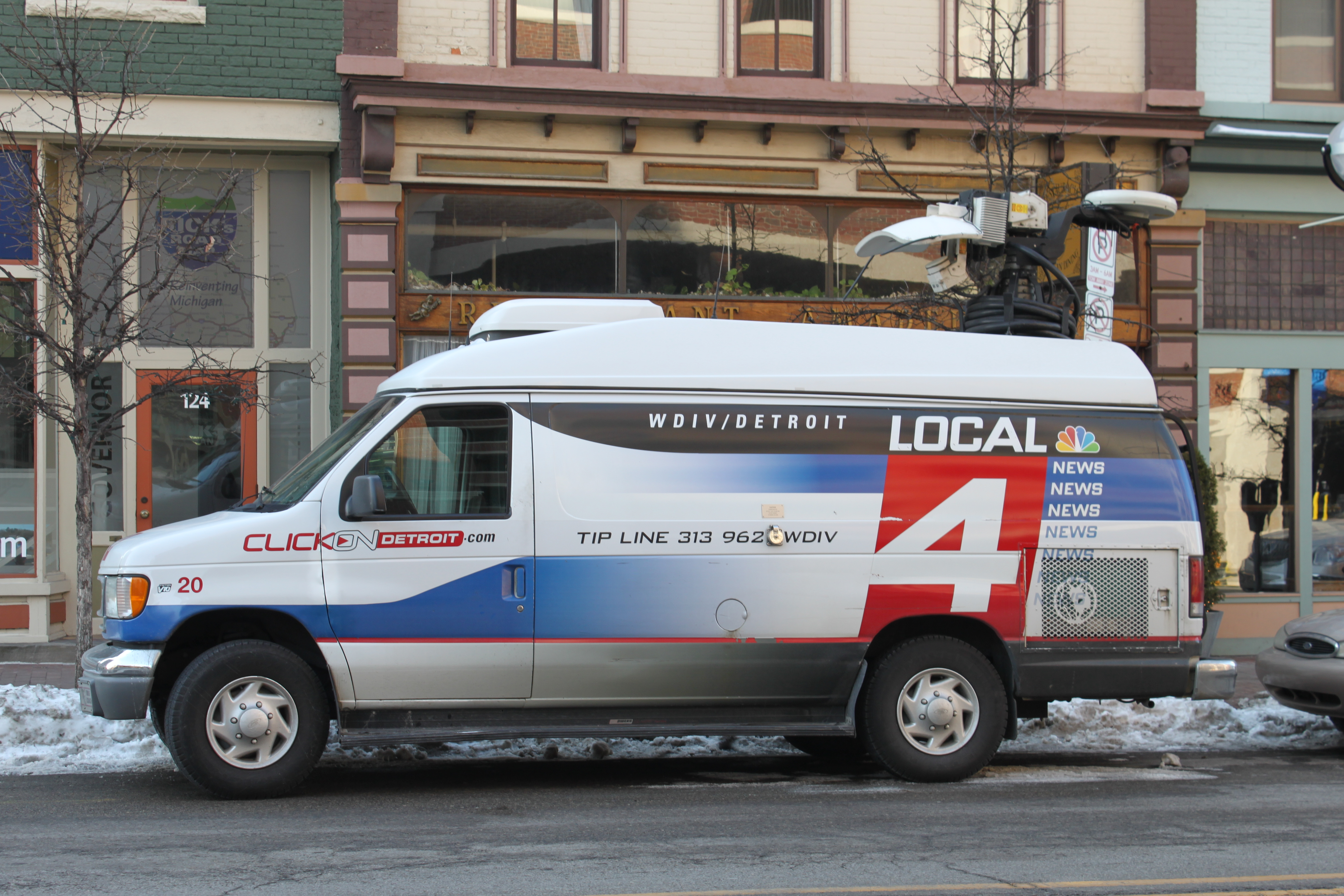
WDIV-TV Local 4 News remote van.

WDIV-TV presently broadcasts 36 1/2 hours of locally produced newscasts each week (with six hours each weekday, three hours on Saturdays and 3 1/2 hours on Sundays). The station uses a Eurocopter A350 helicopter for newsgathering, which is also shared with WJBK and WXYZ-TV through a Local News Service agreement with those stations' respective owners Fox Television Stations and the E. W. Scripps Company. This helicopter features a completely digital HD video system and is quite noticeable from the ground with its large front camera pod and distinctive red paint (hence the callsign "Red Bird"). WDIV also purchases services from Metro Traffic, which provides traffic reporting from its analog SD video platform, aloft on a Bell 206 airframe. This helicopter is blue and white with a smaller camera pod. Both helicopters are operated by HeliInc, which provides aircraft services to broadcasters in many markets.

WDIV's news department operates a fleet of 14 newsgathering vehicles, including 11 standard news ENG (electronic news-gathering) Ford E350 vans with two-band digital microwave transmitters and video editing platforms. One of these trucks is a dual-purpose microwave truck and digital satellite uplink package. The station has one micro-ENG E150 van capable of rapid deployment short-range broadcasts and one additional satellite uplink vehicle with a much larger 1.8-meter antenna.

On January 8, 2007, the station added a half-hour late afternoon newscast at 4 pm. In the spring of 2007, WDIV received an RTNDA Edward R. Murrow Award, one of the highest honors in broadcast journalism. "The China Syndrome", reported and produced by Devin Scillian, was named Best Documentary. On August 19, 2007, starting with the 11 p.m. newscast, WDIV became the second television station in Detroit to begin broadcasting its local newscasts in high definition.

In August 2013, WDIV dropped its noon newscast and converted it into an online-only broadcast to attract viewers who are at work during that timeslot. Viewer demand resulted in the station relaunching the noon newscast on the television station on January 13, 2014.

In August 2014, WDIV unveiled a new studio, designed in-house and constructed by the Livonia, Michigan–based company EWI Worldwide.

On November 11, 2016, Carmen Harlan retired after 38 years at the station to spend more time with her grandchildren.

On September 12, 2022, WDIV expanded its noon newscast to a full hour full-time.

==== Notable former on-air staff ====
- Asa Aarons – consumer reporter (1990–1993)
- Asha Blake – weekend anchor/health reporter (1993–1996)
- Jim Brandstatter – sports producer and reporter (1970s)
- Doug Bruckner – reporter
- Mort Crim – news anchor/radio reporter (1978–1997)
- Vince DeMentri – reporter (1993–1994)
- Carol Duvall – television personality and noon anchor (1960s–1970s)
- Sonny Eliot – weathercaster (1947–1980)
- Shon Gables – morning anchor (2000–2003)
- Chris Hansen – investigative reporter/anchor (1988–1993)
- Fred Hickman – sports anchor (1984–1985)
- Doug Hill – meteorologist (1980–1982)
- Davey Marlin-Jones – film critic (1978–1987)
- Fred McLeod – weekend sports anchor/host of Sports Final Edition on Sunday nights (1989–2006)
- Rob Parker – sports anchor, also co-host of Sports Final Edition
- Devin Scillian – weeknight anchor (1995–2024)
- Anne Thompson – reporter (1986–1997)
- Reynolds Wolf – meteorologist (1999–2002)
- Van Earl Wright – sports anchor (1993–1996)

== Technical information ==
=== Subchannels ===
The station's signal is multiplexed:

Subchannels of WDIV-TV
Subchannel	Res.	Short name	Programming
4.1	1080i	WDIV-HD	NBC
4.2	480i	H&I	Heroes & Icons
4.3	480i	MeTV	MeTV
4.4	480i	COZI	Cozi TV
20.2	480i	WMYD-AT	Antenna TV (WMYD)

Broadcast on behalf of another station

WDIV's second digital subchannel formerly carried programming from NBC Weather Plus, which folded in November 2008. WDIV-TV also has a Mobile DTV feed of subchannel 4.1, labelled "Local 4", broadcasting at 1.83 Mbit/s.

WDIV-DT2 was one of the few affiliates of This TV to have been affiliated with the network through most of its entire history, even as it was dropped in several other markets before Allen Media Group purchased the network in 2021. The network shut down on May 31, 2024, without prior on-air notice or announcement from Allen Media Group. The feed was replaced by a simulcast of the WDIV's fourth subchannel, Cozi TV. In September 2025, Heroes & Icons, which was previously on the fourth subchannel of WJBK, replaced the Cozi TV simulcast.

On July 30, 2015, WDIV-TV became the market's affiliate for Weigel Broadcasting's MeTV network through their third subchannel. WDIV-DT3 is used as an overflow feed for network and syndicated programming if the latter is preempted by breaking news or severe weather coverage on 4.1.

On January 3, 2020, WDIV-TV activated a fourth subchannel, which broadcasts Cozi TV, a network owned by NBC's parent company NBCUniversal. This makes WDIV-TV the third station in the Detroit market to have been affiliated with Cozi TV, which was previously on WMYD and on WADL.

=== Analog-to-digital conversion ===
WDIV-TV signed on its digital signal on UHF channel 45 on March 1, 1999. The station ended regular programming on its analog signal, over VHF channel 4, on June 12, 2009, the official date on which full-power television stations in the United States transitioned from analog to digital broadcasts under federal mandate. The station's digital signal continued to broadcast on its pre-transition channel 45, using virtual channel 4.

As part of the SAFER Act, WDIV kept its analog signal on the air until June 26 to inform viewers of the digital television transition through a loop of public service announcements from the National Association of Broadcasters.

In March 2017, the station announced that it would move its digital signal to UHF channel 32.

== Out-of-market coverage ==
WDIV's over-the-air signal can be picked up as far away as Flint, Lapeer, and Adrian in Michigan, as well as Toledo, Ohio, and even London, Ontario. WDIV is also one of only three American stations—all in Detroit—that mention Windsor and London as among their primary viewing areas, alongside WMYD and WJBK.

WDIV is carried on most cable providers in Southeast Michigan, Southwestern Ontario and Northwestern Ohio. It is also carried on several other Canadian cable providers including Rogers Cable in the capital city of Ottawa well away from the range of its signal. It is one of five Detroit area television stations seen in Canada on satellite provider Shaw Direct and was the original affiliate offered by CANCOM (now Shaw Broadcast Services) starting in September 1983. WDIV is also carried on some cable providers in the Upper Peninsula of Michigan in communities such as Seney, Republic and Grand Marais.

CANCOM/Shaw's carriage of WDIV stretches outside of Canada with cable carriage in places as varied as far northern New York state (Alexandria Bay) (since removed in 2024), all of Bermuda, parts of Latin America and for a time in the early 1990s, some parts of Ireland (with a delay). In addition, WDIV is carried on some cable providers in Mexico, via Shaw Broadcast Services, such the Cablemás system in Ciudad Juárez, which offers WDIV instead of fellow NBC affiliate KTSM-TV in nearby El Paso, Texas. From 1985 to circa 1998, WDIV was the NBC affiliate carried by Cable Atlantic (now Rogers Cable) in Newfoundland and Labrador including in St. John's before the provider switched to the network's Boston affiliate WHDH (which was affiliated with NBC from 1995 to 2017; it is now independent).

Coverage on cable providers outside the Detroit–Windsor market may be subject to syndication exclusivity and network blackouts in the United States and simsubbing in Canada.

== See also ==
- Media in Detroit
