= WDFN =

Black Information Network radio station in Detroit

- Detroit, Michigan; United States
- Broadcast area: Metro Detroit
- Frequency: 1130 kHz
- Branding: Detroit's BIN 1130

Programming
- Format: African-American all news
- Affiliations: Black Information Network; Motor Racing Network

Ownership
- Owner: iHeartMedia, Inc.; (iHM Licenses, LLC)
- Sister stations: WJLB; WKQI; WLLZ; WMXD; WNIC

History
- First air date: December 17, 1939
- Former call signs: WCAR (1939–1979); WCXI (1979–1992); WWWW (1992–1994)
- Call sign meaning: "Detroit's The Fan" (former branding)

Technical information
- Licensing authority: FCC
- Facility ID: 59969
- Class: B
- Power: 50,000 watts (day); 10,000 watts (night)
- Transmitter coordinates: 42°6′39.2″N 83°11′51.7″W

Links
- Public license information: Public file; LMS
- Webcast: Listen live (via iHeartRadio)
- Website: detroit.binnews.com

WDFN (1130 kHz) is a commercial AM radio station in Detroit, Michigan. Owned by iHeartMedia, it broadcasts an all-news radio format under iHeartRadio's Black Information Network (BIN), targeting Detroit's African-American community. Its studios and offices are on Halsted Road in the Detroit suburb of Farmington Hills.

By day, WDFN transmits with 50,000 watts, the maximum for commercial U.S. AM radio stations. AM 1130 is a clear channel frequency reserved for Class A stations in New York City, Vancouver and Shreveport, so to avoid interference, WDFN reduces power at night to 10,000 watts. It uses a directional antenna with a nine-tower array. The transmitter is on Vreeland Road at West Jefferson Avenue in the downriver community of Gibraltar.

== History ==
=== Early years ===
The station signed on the air on December 17, 1939. It used the call sign WCAR from its inception until 1979. WCAR was originally licensed to the Detroit suburb of Pontiac, Michigan. It initially broadcast on 1100 kHz with 1,000 watts as a daytime only station. The owners were "a group of Pontiac citizens," including H.Y. Levinson, who owned half of the stock and managed the station. Levinson also was publisher of the Farmington Enterprise, a weekly newspaper in Farmington, Michigan.

With the 1941 enactment of the North American Regional Broadcasting Agreement (NARBA), WCAR moved to 1130 AM, still with 1,000 watts, and did not have authorization to broadcast after sunset.

For most of the 1950s and 1960s, WCAR aired a middle-of-the-road/adult standards music format, as Levinson insisted that his station play only "good music" and refused to allow anything even remotely resembling rock and roll on his station's playlist.

In the 1960s, WCAR was given permission by the Federal Communications Commission (FCC) to move to the more lucrative Detroit radio market. The move came with a boost in power to 50,000 watts days and 10,000 watts nights. In 1964, it also added an FM station, WCAR-FM 92.3 (now WMXD).

=== 1970s: Giant 1130 ===
Levinson would eventually relax his anti-rock stance when it became evident that the conservative "good music" approach wasn't making him enough money. By 1970, "W-Car" had transitioned to a personality MOR Contemporary format (what would be considered Hot Adult Contemporary today). The station played more hit singles and fewer MOR album cuts while shying away from very hard rock, and featuring new jingles and a "hipper" image built around slogans such as "W-Car Cares About Detroit and Its People" (including inventive homemade public service announcements and promos for local businesses such as marriage counselors). By the summer of 1971, the station had added harder rock and roll records to its format, and that fall the station made the full transition into Top 40 as "All Hit Music, The Giant 1130," similar in presentation to market leader CKLW. This incarnation of W-Car was consulted by Ken Draper, who at the time was programming similar formats on WFDF in Flint (which was known as "Giant 91") and WJIM in Lansing.

W-Car's Top 40 incarnation featured an airstaff including Detroit radio veterans such as Dave L. Prince, Scott Regen, and former CKLW and WIXY Cleveland personality Steve Hunter. Hunter recalled on the CKLW tribute Website (http://www.big8radio.com/) that although WCAR sounded good, its locally based ownership did not have the money needed to sustain cash giveaways and other prizes, and the format was changed just before a new ratings book came in showing promising growth in the station's ratings. W-Car would trudge through several more failed formats during the remainder of the 1970s, including progressive rock (being one of the few AM stations to feature this kind of music, now known as album oriented rock), all-news (using the NBC News and Information service), and another try at adult contemporary with new owners Golden West Broadcasters, which bought the AM and FM in the summer of 1977. The owners switched the station from news and talk back to music in October 1977.

From 1971 to 1974, George Noory, now host of the syndicated Coast to Coast AM overnight radio show on Premiere Networks, worked at WCAR.

=== WCXI ===
In March 1979, WCAR changed its format to country and adopted the call sign WCXI ("Country 11"; the "C" stood for Country, and "XI" is "11" in Roman numerals). General Manager John Risher, who had run popular country station WDEE during the early to mid-1970s, brought back popular award-winning morning personality Deano Day, Bob Burchett and a few others who had worked at "The Big-D" to the air staff. Program Director Bill Ford was held over from the previous WCAR adult contemporary format as well as new music director Bob "R.T." Griffin. After his success with WCXI, Ford left the station to program WKHK in New York City. Dan Dixon (later of XM Radio), Larry Patton and Greg Raab were the following Program Directors, with Raab also being the station's Promotions Director from early 1979.

With WDEE gone and its only competitor in the country format being Windsor, Ontario's CKLW-FM (which focused its programming on the Canadian side of the border), WCXI became very popular for a year or two. However, WCXI took a hit once WWWW changed its format from album-oriented rock to country in 1980, becoming (apart from CKLW-FM) Detroit's first live country station on FM since WDEE-FM a decade earlier. (WCAR-FM was automated country in 1977 until it became WTWR in early 1978.) To better compete with W4 Country, WCXI/WTWR-FM's owner, Gene Autry's Golden West Broadcasters, again changed Top 40/oldies-formatted WTWR to WCXI-FM, and was programmed separately from the AM - but simulcasting Deano Day for a short time when he returned again to the station after a brief run in Los Angeles in early 1982. WCXI-FM was unable to beat W4. New owner Fritz Broadcasting changed format in May 1986 to adult contemporary as WNTM (later becoming WVAE and then WMXD). In the meantime, WCXI was sold to Shamrock Broadcasting, owners of W4, on the same date as the FM station and continued to suffer from low ratings through the 1980s. By the latter part of the decade, the station had adopted the "Real Country" branding and began to focus more on classic country.

Finally, in 1992, WCXI became WWWW, staying with country music but now simulcasting WWWW-FM.

=== The Fan ===
WDFN logo, 2009–2011

WWWW changed its call letters to WDFN in May 1994, and on July 11 of that year, it became a sports-talk station branded as "The Fan". For much of its run in the format, WDFN competed with WXYT (1270 AM), and later WXYT-FM (97.1), for Detroit's sports-talk audience.

WDFN affiliated with Fox Sports Radio in May 2003. Before then, it was affiliated with ESPN Radio. The station was the Detroit outlet for national radio broadcasts of NFL games via Westwood One, including Sunday and Monday Night Football, NFL postseason games, and the Super Bowl from 1997 through 2004. When the Detroit Lions were not playing that Sunday, it would occasionally air the afternoon doubleheader.

From 2001 to 2009, WDFN was the Detroit Pistons' flagship radio station.

On December 18, 2005, prior to the Lions' final home game of the season against the Cincinnati Bengals, WDFN organized a "Millen Man March" outside Ford Field, in support of the many fans outraged by the leadership of then-team president Matt Millen, under whom the Lions were 20–57. The station also purchased a billboard ad by the stadium which read "Not This Millenium - Rebuilding Since 1957", which is the last year the Lions won an NFL championship.

On July 13, 2007, Stoney and Wojo were the substitute hosts on the popular nationally syndicated The Jim Rome Show for the vacationing Jim Rome.

On January 20, 2009, WDFN's local programming was replaced by the programs of the nationally syndicated Fox Sports Radio. Sean Baligian signed off at noon, leading into coverage of the inauguration of President Barack Obama. On February 5, WXYT-FM acquired the rights to become the Pistons' flagship station starting in the 2009–10 season. The Pistons cited they moved to WXYT-FM due to WDFN's weak signal, as a lot of listeners were having difficulty receiving the station without interference.

After several months without local programming aside from updates and Pistons broadcasts, Matt Shepard returned on April 6, relaunching his live morning show, Shep, Shower and Shave. Longtime sports director and University of Detroit Titans basketball announcer Matt Dery left the station for competitor WXYT. Rob Pascoe also joined WXYT after being released from WDFN, and on April 28, 2009, Rob Otto was also given his release. In addition, WDFN would drop the "Fan" branding and rebranded as simply "Detroit Sports Talk."

On October 1, 2010, WDFN dropped the "Detroit Sports Talk" branding and returned to being "The Fan," but in 2013, it altered the on-air program format significantly, deviating from the former sports format.

On May 2, 2017, Matt Shepard, one of the few survivors of WDFN's 2009 layoffs, was released by the station after anchoring the morning drive for more than 8 years. Shepard had also anchored the hourly sports updates from 2001 through 2007, and again starting in April 2008 after a brief stint at WXYT. On November 16, it was announced that Shepard was coming back to the station, with his morning show relaunched on November 20.

=== Black Information Network ===
On June 29, 2020, WDFN ended its 26-year run as a sports talk station, and began stunting with speeches by prominent African Americans. The next day, WDFN flipped to all-news radio as Detroit's BIN 1130.

WDFN is one of the charter stations of iHeartMedia's Black Information Network. BIN is a multi-platform radio network serving the African-American community. The network has more than three dozen affiliates around the U.S.

== See also ==
- Media in Detroit
