= Ed Coil =

American businessman (1931–2021)

Edwin E. Coil (October 28, 1931 – February 15, 2021) was an American business executive with the Zollner Corporation who served as general manager of the Detroit Pistons from 1966 to 1975.

Coil was born October 28, 1931, in Willshire, Ohio. He graduated from Spencerville High School and the International Business College. He served in the United States Army from 1951 to 1953.

Coil spent 34 years with the Zollner Corporation, starting as an accountant and finishing as vice-chairman. On May 3, 1966, he was named general manager of the Detroit Pistons, which were owned by Zollner Corporation president Fred Zollner. Author Steve Addy credited Coil with keeping the team financially stable despite many years of poor attendance. Coil hired the team's first and second African-American head coaches (Earl Lloyd and Ray Scott) and put together a team that made the 1974 NBA playoffs. Coil was the only member of the Pistons management team to be retained after Bill Davidson purchased the team in 1974. On July 1, 1975, Coil returned to the Zollner Corporation and one of the team's owners, Oscar Feldman, took over Coil's duties.

Coil also spent eighteen years on the Adams County Commission and was county treasurer for one year. Coil died on February 15, 2021, in Decatur, Indiana.
