= SRG Global =

Manufacturer

SRG Global, Inc.
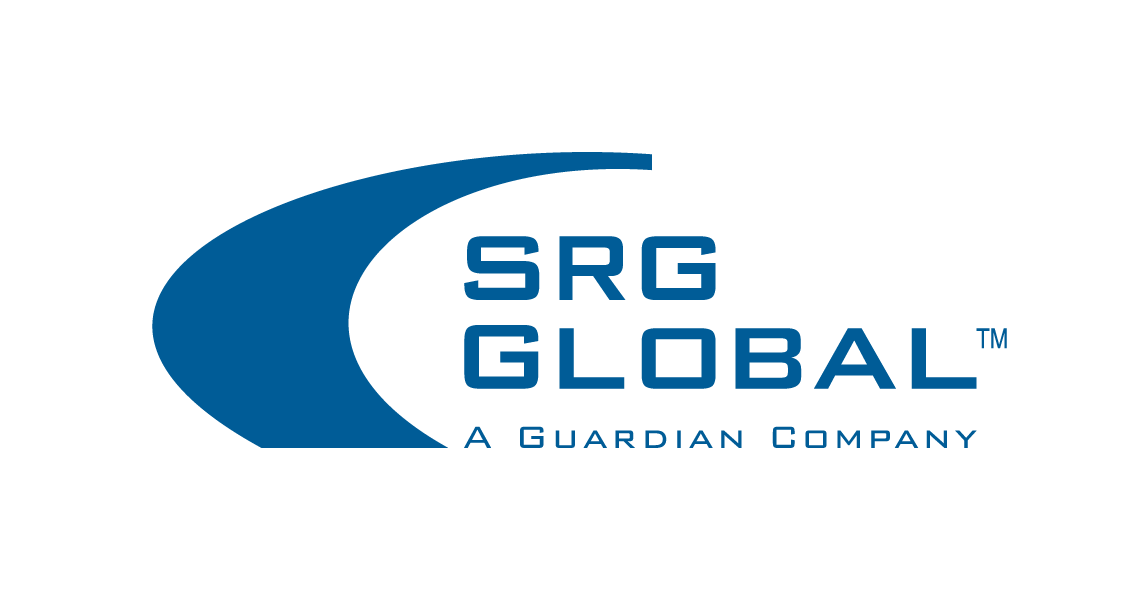
- Type: Private
- Industry: Automotive, Transportation
- Founded: 1932; 94 years ago
- Headquarters: Troy, Michigan, U.S.
- Key people: Merritt Gaunt (president and CEO)
- Parent: Guardian Industries

SRG Global Inc. is one of the largest manufacturers of chrome plated plastic parts for the automotive and commercial truck industries. Headquartered near Detroit in Troy, Michigan, the Tier 1 supplier has manufacturing operations across North America, Europe and Asia. The company’s Advanced Development Center in Taylor, Michigan, is a dedicated facility for developing new plastics coating technology.

== Overview ==
SRG Global Inc. is a wholly owned subsidiary of Guardian Industries, a privately held company based in Auburn Hills, Michigan. Guardian began in 1932 as a small automotive windshield fabricator in Detroit. As of 2009 Guardian was operating on five continents with more than 18,000 employees. The approximately $5 billion conglomerate is an industry leader in float glass, fabricated glass products, fiberglass insulation, and building materials for commercial, residential and automotive markets.

SRG Global was established in 2009 after Guardian acquired Siegel-Robert Automotive, a manufacturer of electroplated plastic parts for the North American automotive industry. The new company brought together the global trim operations of Guardian Automotive and Siegel-Robert, forming a group that is one of the largest manufacturers of chrome plated plastic parts in the world. SRG Global has manufacturing operations in five states across the Midwestern and Southern U.S. It also has two manufacturing plants in Spain, one in China, and a facility in Poland. Expansion into Irapuato, Mexico occurred in 2011.

== Early years ==
- 1932 – Guardian Glass Company was established as a small automotive windshield fabricator in Detroit, Michigan.
- 1957 – William Davidson was named president of Guardian. The company would remain under his leadership for more than five decades.
- 1968 – Guardian became a public company and the name was changed to Guardian Industries Corp., which included windshield fabrication operations, 10 automotive glass distribution centers and a photofinishing division.
- 1970 – Float glass operations commenced in Carleton, Michigan, making Guardian the first company to enter the U.S. primary glass industry in nearly 50 years.
- 1981 – Guardian’s float glass business extended overseas with a new facility in Luxembourg.
- 1985 – Guardian completed the transition to a private company after 17 years on the public stock exchange.

== Birth of the trim business ==
- 1982 – Guardian acquired Windsor Plastics, an Evansville, Indiana-based manufacturer of decorative thermoplastics for business machines, household appliances, automobiles and plumbing fixtures.
- 1996 – Guardian purchased a 70 percent interest in Automotive Molding Company (AMC), a manufacturer of plastic and metal exterior body components based in Warren, Michigan. With manufacturing facilities in Michigan and Georgia, AMC’s products included body side moldings, backlite and windshield trim, and rocker panels. Established in 1948. Combined with the acquisition of Windsor Plastics, this strategic move positioned Guardian as the only supplier in the automotive industry with the capability to supply the entire exterior trim and molding systems for cars and trucks.
- 1998 – Guardian acquired trim manufacturer Lab. Radio in Valencia, Spain. Founded in 1977, products included wheel covers, interior trim panels, emblems, cowl panels, door belt moldings, radiator grilles and air bag covers.
- 1997 – To keep up with demand, a new trim plant was opened in Morehead, Kentucky. Processes included injection molding, painting and electroplating. Initially the plant’s primary customer was Ford, for which it manufactured parts for the Econoline, F-150, Expedition, Explorer and Lincoln platforms. Subsequent plant expansions led to increased opportunities with Ford, as well as with DaimlerChrysler.
- 1999 – Guardian received the General Motors Supplier of the Year Award and was ranked 85th on the Automotive News list of the top 100 global automotive suppliers.
- 2008 – Guardian acquired Siegel-Robert Automotive, a Fenton, Missouri-based manufacturer of decorative trim products including grilles, nameplates and door handles. Founded in 1946 by Henry Siegel and Bruce Robert, the privately held company pioneered chrome-plated plastics in the 1960s and had a long history of plating and injection-molding expertise serving major manufacturers like Toyota, General Motors, Honda, DaimlerChrysler, Nissan, Ford and Harley-Davidson. At the time of the acquisition, Guardian had automotive trim operations in Indiana, Kentucky, Georgia, Michigan and Spain. Siegel-Robert had plants in Missouri, Kentucky, Tennessee and China.
- 2009 – The formation of SRG Global Inc. was announced at the Geneva International Motor Show in Geneva, Switzerland. The new, privately held company brought together the trim operations of Guardian Automotive and the recently purchased Siegel-Robert Automotive. SRG Global employs about 4,000 people in manufacturing plants and technical centers located across the U.S., and in China, Japan and Europe. In June 2009, SRG Global broke ground on a new $25 million automotive trim manufacturing facility in Bolesławiec, Poland.
- 2010 – SRG Global opened its Advanced Development Center in Taylor, Michigan, to advance the development of new plastics coating technology. The company also announced its investment in a new 175,000-square-foot (16,300 m^{2}) plastic injection molding and chrome plating plant in central Mexico.
- 2011 – In February 2011, SRG Global started construction on its new manufacturing facility in Irapuato, Mexico. In June 2011, the Bolesławiec Poland location started production, shipping its first parts to customers.
- 2012 – In February 2012, one year after groundbreaking, the new Irapuato Mexico facility entered production and started shipping to customers.

== Recent developments ==
SRG Global's Advanced Development Center opened in May 2010 in Taylor, a suburb of Detroit. The 46,000-square-foot (4,300 m^{2}) facility houses a chrome plating line and four injection molding presses ranging from 165 to 2,200 tons to create parts for coating and testing in the center’s on-site laboratories. The Advanced Development Center is also equipped to produce custom, limited-run parts for concept vehicles.

The History Channel featured SRG Global's Morehead, Kentucky, plant in a program entitled "Modern Marvels: Chrome" which aired on cable TV in March 2010. In addition to chronicling the history of chrome and Americans' infatuation with it, the episode followed the injection molding and chrome plating process of a Ford F-150 grille, one of the company's flagship products.

In August 2010, Ford Motor Company awarded SRG Global’s Ripley, Tennessee, plant with the Ford Q1 quality award. Other SRG Global facilities that have achieved Ford Q1 designation include Newbern, Tennessee; Evansville, Indiana; Morehead, Kentucky; Covington, Georgia; Valencia, Spain; and Suzhou, China.

In February 2011, Chrysler unveiled their new "Imported From Detroit" campaign with ads featuring Detroit rapper Eminem, one of which aired during the Super Bowl XLV. The two-minute spot featuring the new Chrysler 200 showcased SRG Global products originating from five SRG Global locations.

In September 2014, General Motors awarded five of its manufacturing facilities across three continents a Supplier Quality Excellence Award. Awards are given to recognize an individual facility for consistently meeting or exceeding General Motors’ quality performance standards during the 2013-2014 award year. SRG Global facilities that received this designation were: Portageville, Missouri; Newbern, Tennessee; and Evansville, Indiana, SRG Global's European facility in Lliria, Spain and the Suzhou facility in Jiangsu Province, China.

In October 2014, SRG Global announced the expansion of its operations in China with the development of a new manufacturing facility in east-central Hubei province. The 23,000-square-meter facility will be the company's second in the region. The new facility will have a fully automated plating line, including Chrome III technology, painting, plastic injection molding and built-in assembly. The new facility will be SRG Global's 14th manufacturing facility in the world.

In 2021, SRG was named as a defendant in a number of lawsuits filed by Covington, Georgia residents that allege the company released trichloroethylene into the community’s ground water, causing an increase in cancer cases amongst Covington residents.
