= Oscar Feldman =

American attorney (1921–2024)

Oscar Henry Feldman (August 18, 1921 – November 27, 2024) was an American attorney who was a longtime minority owner and legal counsel of the Detroit Pistons of the National Basketball Association. From 1975 to 1977 he was also the team's general manager.

== Early life ==
Feldman was born in Poughkeepsie, New York, on August 18, 1921. He enrolled at the University of Michigan in 1939, where he met his future business partner, Bill Davidson. He served in the United States Army during World War II and after the war, he earned a Master of Business Administration from Michigan and a law degree from the Columbia Law School. After graduating, he taught at Columbia for one year then worked for the Internal Revenue Service in the office of the chief counsel. In 1951, Feldman returned to Michigan, where he purchased a pharmaceutical company with Davidson and taught law at Wayne State University. He took over his father-in-law's law practice following his sudden death and served as a legal counsel for Guardian Industries, which was run by Davidson.

== Detroit Pistons ==
On July 29, 1974, Davidson, Feldman, and nine other partners purchased the Detroit Pistons from Fred Zollner for $8.1 million. General manager Ed Coil agreed to stay with the team for one year following the sale and when he departed on July 1, 1975, Feldman succeeded him as general manager. On January 26, 1976, Feldman fired the team's then-winningest coach, Ray Scott due to his poor "rapport with the entire organization". The Pistons, who had gone 17–25 under Scott, went 19–21 under his replacement Herb Brown and made it to the Western Conference semifinals, where they lost to the Golden State Warriors in six games.

The Pistons selected Marvin Barnes in the 1976 ABA dispersal draft and after protracted negotiations, Feldman signed him to a $500,000-a-year contract. Soon after signing, Barnes was arrested for carrying a concealed handgun at the Detroit Metropolitan Airport and, after the Pistons were eliminated from the playoffs, began serving a jail sentence for violating his probation. On May 25, 1977, Feldman stepped down as general manager in favor of his handpicked successor – Atlanta Hawks assistant GM and former Buffalo Braves All-Star Bob Kauffman. Feldman remained with the team as legal counsel and worked on the team's relocation from the Cobo Arena to the Pontiac Silverdome. Kauffman resigned for personal reasons at the end of the season and Feldman took over his duties. The Pistons went 30–52 and missed the playoffs in 1978–79 under new head coach Dick Vitale.

In the summer of 1979, Pistons forward M. L. Carr signed as a free agent with the Boston Celtics. The two teams could not agree on compensation for Carr, with Vitale wanting Bob McAdoo and Celtics GM Red Auerbach wanting to send Curtis Rowe and another player to Detroit. The dispute ended when the Pistons agreed to trade two first round picks in 1980 NBA draft to the Celtics for McAdoo. The Pistons made another high-priced acquisition that same offseason by signing Jim McElroy. After the team got off to a 4–8 start, Feldman fired Vitale and named assistant coach Richie Adubato as his interim replacement. On December 11, 1979, the Pistons named Indiana Pacers assistant coach Jack McCloskey general manager, ending Feldman's run as head of basketball operations. Detroit finished the season with a league-worst 16–66 record, which gave the Celtics the top pick in the 1980 draft (Boston traded the pick to the Golden State Warriors in exchange for Robert Parish and the #3 overall pick, which they used to select Kevin McHale).

Feldman remained with the Pistons as a minority owner until October 2009. Feldman died on November 27, 2024, at the age of 103.
