= I'm going to Disney World! =

Advertising slogan

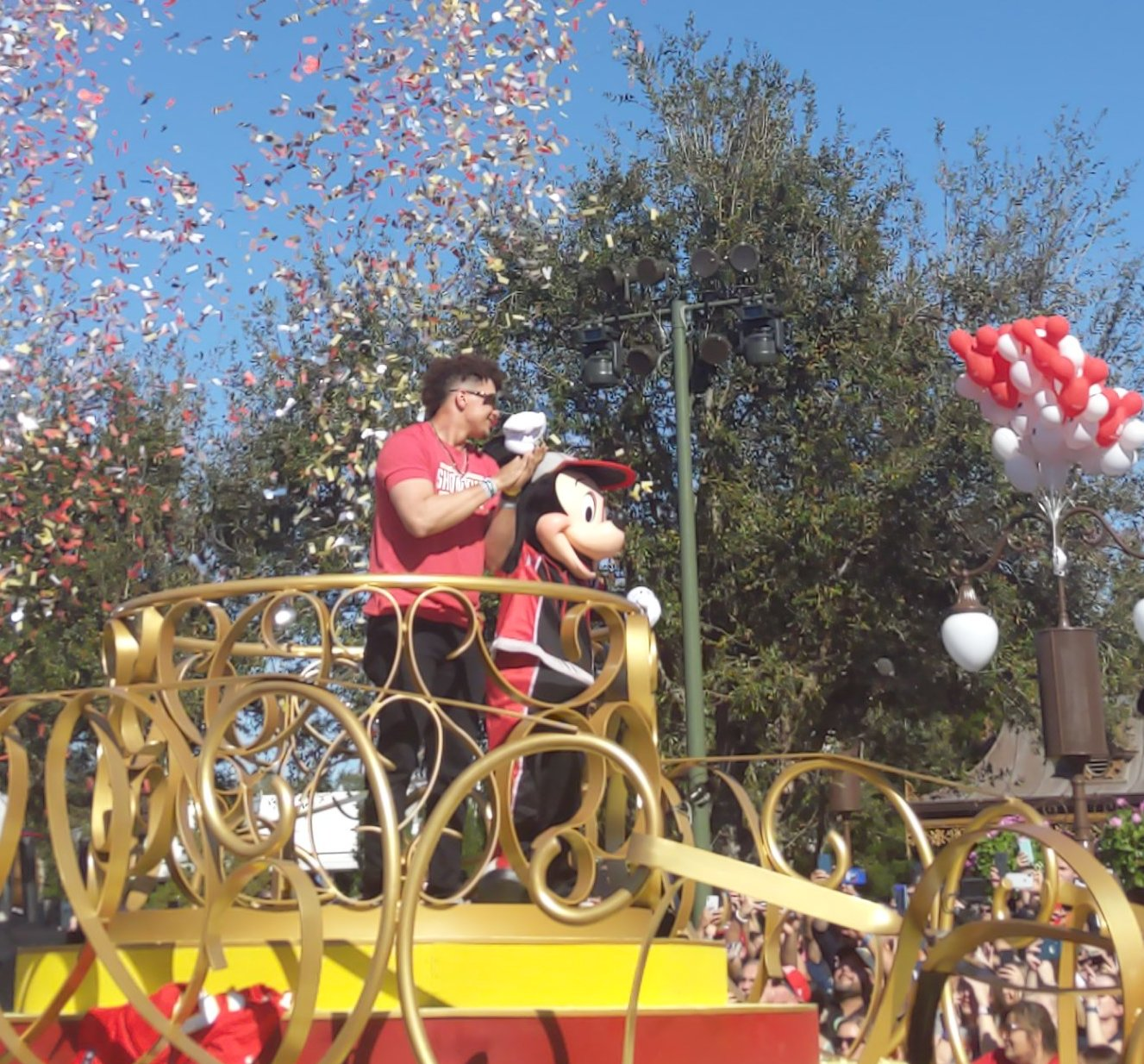
Super Bowl LIV MVP Patrick Mahomes in the parade at the Magic Kingdom the day after the game

"I'm going to Disney World!" and "I'm going to Disneyland!" are advertising slogans used in a series of television commercials by The Walt Disney Company that began airing in 1987. Used to promote the company's theme park resorts, Disney World and Disneyland in Florida and California, respectively, the commercials most often are broadcast following the Super Bowl and typically feature an NFL player (usually the Super Bowl MVP) shouting the phrase while celebrating the team's victory immediately after the championship game. These commercials have also promoted champions from other sports, athletes setting records, and winners of non-sport competitions such as American Idol.

== Format ==
Disney refers to the campaign as "What's Next?" in reference to the commercial's usual format, which has the star appear to be answering a question posed by an unseen narrator—"What are you going to do next?"—after his or her moment of triumph. The narrator is Mark Champion, a veteran radio play-by-play announcer for the Tampa Bay Buccaneers, Detroit Lions, Detroit Pistons, and Westwood One. Most ads feature the song "When You Wish Upon a Star" and end with a shot of fireworks over Cinderella Castle in Disney World or Sleeping Beauty Castle in Disneyland.

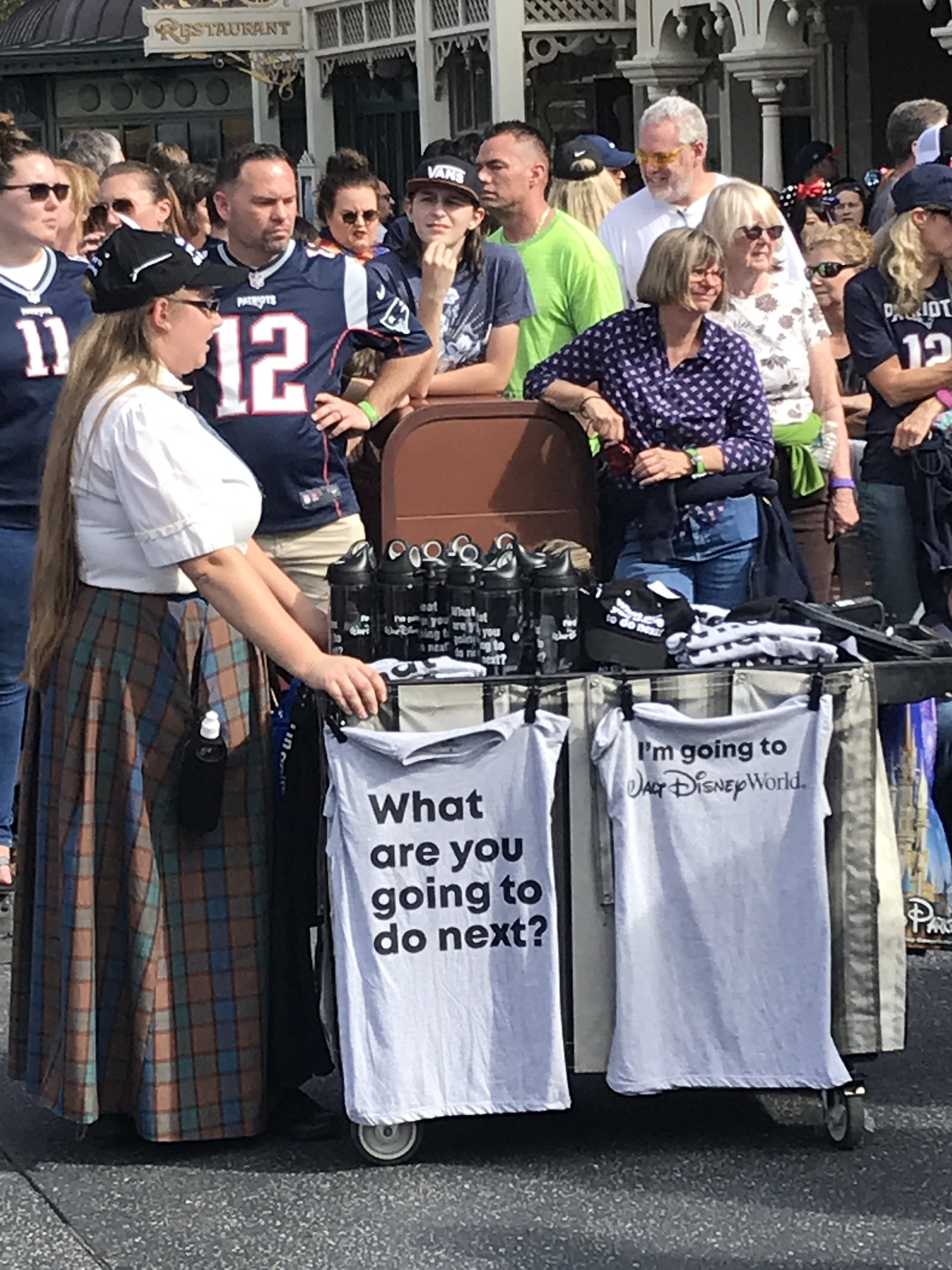
"I'm going to Disney World!" merch being sold in Magic Kingdom before the 2019 victory parade

Typically the star records two versions of the commercial, one for each phrase, so that the ads can be broadcast in different American media markets to strategically promote either Disney World in Florida or Disneyland in California. In most cases, Disney arranges for its star to appear in a parade at either Disneyland or one of the Disney World theme parks the day immediately following the victory in order to fulfill the spoken promise in one version.

== History ==
=== Original campaign ===
In his 1998 memoir Work in Progress, Disney CEO Michael Eisner credited his wife, Jane, with the idea for the campaign. According to Eisner, during the January 1987 grand opening for the Star Tours attraction at Disneyland, the couple dined with Dick Rutan and Jeana Yeager, who in December 1986 had piloted the first aircraft to fly around the world without stopping or refueling. After Jane Eisner asked what the pilots planned to do next, they replied, "Well, we're going to Disneyland." She later told her husband the phrase would make a great advertising campaign.

Following Super Bowl XXI on January 25, 1987, a Disney commercial starred New York Giants quarterback Phil Simms, in which he was asked "Phil Simms, you've just won the Super Bowl. What are you doing next?". Simms, who replied "I'm gonna go to Disney World!", was paid $75,000; John Elway was paid the same amount, in case the Denver Broncos won.

Following Super Bowl XXV in 1991, Ottis Anderson, the game's MVP, was given the choice to say "I'm going to Disney World!" or to dedicate his victory to American troops serving in the then-ongoing Gulf War. Anderson chose the latter, and the line was once again given to Phil Simms.

While appearing in a subsequent parade at the Walt Disney World Resort, 1994 Winter Olympics figure skater Nancy Kerrigan was recorded saying to Mickey Mouse, "This is dumb. I hate it. This is the most corniest thing I have ever done." Kerrigan, however, claimed that her remarks had been misinterpreted. She claimed that while participating in the parade was not corny, wearing her Silver Medal was because her parents had taught her not to boast or flaunt her accomplishments. Kerrigan also went on to say that she had nothing against The Walt Disney Company or Mickey Mouse and said, "Whoever could find fault with Mickey Mouse? He's the greatest mouse I've ever known."

Ray Lewis was named Super Bowl XXXV MVP, but because of a murder trial he was involved in the previous year, the phrase "I'm going to Disney World!" was given instead to quarterback Trent Dilfer.

In subsequent years, Disney reportedly has offered $30,000 to athletes and other stars for participating in the ads and appearing at one of its theme parks.

=== 2006 return ===
In 2006, the campaign resumed before Super Bowl XL (televised by Disney-owned ABC), as Disney projected scenes from the 20-year history of the campaign onto a Detroit skyscraper in the days before the game. During the television broadcast, Disney aired a commercial showing members of the Pittsburgh Steelers and Seattle Seahawks practicing how they would deliver the famous phrase while preparing for the game. The following day, the company began airing a traditional "What's Next" commercial featuring Steelers Hines Ward and Jerome Bettis. Even though it was not part of the ad buy in 2016, Peyton Manning said the famous phrase in an interview after Super Bowl 50.

Although Tom Brady was named MVP of Super Bowl LI, he gave the Disney trip to teammate James White.

=== 2020 overhaul ===
For Super Bowl LIV in 2020, Disney Parks, Experiences and Products was the official sponsor of that game's MVP ceremony; Patrick Mahomes' announcement of the phrase was thus embedded into the broadcast post-game show, which included appearances by Mickey and Minnie Mouse alongside 10 year-old Make-a-Wish child Nathaniel from Austin, Texas. During the Disney World parade honoring Mahomes, Nathaniel also took part, representing the Make-a-Wish Foundation. Nathaniel also posed with Mahomes, Disney Parks, Experiences and Products Chairman Bob Chapek, Mickey and Minnie, NFL Commissioner Roger Goodell and Make-A-Wish America President/CEO Richard K. Davis when Chapek announced a $1 million donation to the Make-a-Wish Foundation in Mahomes' honor. 17 other children from the Make-A-Wish Foundation also got free passes to attend the parade as well.

In February 2026 immediately following Super Bowl LX, Disney premiered a commercial featuring Disney characters and personalities proclaiming their intent to go to Super Bowl LXI (which will be held in 2027); the spot marked the launch of a company-wide "Year of the Super Bowl" campaign to promote the game, as it will be televised by Disney-owned ABC and ESPN.

== Stars and celebrations ==
The commercials generally star a single NFL player immediately following the Super Bowl but the campaign also has featured athletes from other championship games and several non-celebrities.

Year	Person and affiliation	Event	"I'm going to..."	Sources
1987	Phil Simms (New York Giants)	Super Bowl XXI	Walt Disney World	
1987	Dennis Conner on the yacht Stars & Stripes	America's Cup	Walt Disney World	
1987	Magic Johnson (Los Angeles Lakers)	NBA Finals	Disneyland	
1987	Frank Viola (Minnesota Twins)	World Series	Walt Disney World	
1988	Doug Williams (Washington Redskins)	Super Bowl XXII	Walt Disney World and Disneyland	
1988	Gretchen Carlson (Miss Minnesota)	Miss America	Walt Disney World	
1988	Brian Boitano, U.S. figure skater	Winter Olympics		
1988	Orel Hershiser (Los Angeles Dodgers)	World Series	Walt Disney World	
1988	Kareem Abdul-Jabbar (Los Angeles Lakers)	NBA Finals	Disneyland	
1989	Joe Montana (San Francisco 49ers)	Super Bowl XXIII	Disneyland	
1989	Al MacInnis (Calgary Flames)	Stanley Cup Final		
1989	Joe Dumars (Detroit Pistons)	NBA Finals	Walt Disney World	
1990	Joe Montana (San Francisco 49ers)	Super Bowl XXIV	Walt Disney World and Disneyland	
1990	Jim Thompson	Temple University graduation		
1990	Matt Kaldenberg, Phyllis Kaldenberg, and Laura McEwen	Simpson College graduation		
1991	Ottis Anderson (New York Giants)	Super Bowl XXV		
1991	Michael Jordan (Chicago Bulls)	NBA Finals	Walt Disney World	
1992	Mark Rypien (Washington Redskins)	Super Bowl XXVI		
1993	Troy Aikman (Dallas Cowboys)	Super Bowl XXVII	Walt Disney World	
1993	Patrick Roy (Montreal Canadiens)	Stanley Cup Final	Disneyland	
1994	Jeff Gordon (Hendrick Motorsports)	Brickyard 400		
1994	Emmitt Smith (Dallas Cowboys)	Super Bowl XXVIII	Walt Disney World and Disneyland	
1994	Nancy Kerrigan, U.S. figure skater	Winter Olympics		
1995	Jerry Rice and Steve Young (San Francisco 49ers)	Super Bowl XXIX		
1996	Emmitt Smith (Dallas Cowboys)	Super Bowl XXX		
1997	Desmond Howard (Green Bay Packers)	Super Bowl XXXI		
1997	Santa Claus	Christmas		
1998	John Elway (Denver Broncos)	Super Bowl XXXII		
1998	Mark McGwire (St. Louis Cardinals)	Major League Baseball home run record		
1999	Terrell Davis and John Elway (Denver Broncos)	Super Bowl XXXIII		
1999	United States women's national soccer team	FIFA Women's World Cup		
2000	Kurt Warner (St. Louis Rams)	Super Bowl XXXIV		
2001	Trent Dilfer (Baltimore Ravens)	Super Bowl XXXV		
2001	Barry Bonds (San Francisco Giants)	Major League Baseball home run record		
2002	Tom Brady (New England Patriots)	Super Bowl XXXVI	Walt Disney World	
2002	Scott Spiezio (Anaheim Angels)	World Series		
2003	Jon Gruden and Brad Johnson (Tampa Bay Buccaneers)	Super Bowl XXXVII		
2004	Tom Brady (New England Patriots)	Super Bowl XXXVIII	Walt Disney World	
2004	Curt Schilling, Pedro Martínez, and David Ortiz (Boston Red Sox)	World Series	Walt Disney World	
2004	Dave Andreychuk (Tampa Bay Lightning)	Stanley Cup Final		
2006	Hines Ward and Jerome Bettis (Pittsburgh Steelers)	Super Bowl XL	Walt Disney World	
2006	Dwyane Wade (Miami Heat)	NBA Finals		
2007	Tony Dungy and Dominic Rhodes (Indianapolis Colts)	Super Bowl XLI	Walt Disney World	
2007	Teemu Selänne (Anaheim Ducks)	Stanley Cup Final		
2008	Eli Manning (New York Giants)	Super Bowl XLII	Walt Disney World and Disneyland	
2008	David Cook	American Idol season 7	Walt Disney World	
2009	Ben Roethlisberger and Santonio Holmes (Pittsburgh Steelers)	Super Bowl XLIII	Walt Disney World	
2009	Kris Allen	American Idol season 8	Walt Disney World	
2009	Bruce Springsteen	Super Bowl XLIII halftime show	Disneyland	
2010	Drew Brees (New Orleans Saints)	Super Bowl XLIV	Walt Disney World	
2010	Lee DeWyze	American Idol season 9	Walt Disney World	
2011	Aaron Rodgers (Green Bay Packers)	Super Bowl XLV	Walt Disney World and Disneyland	
2011	Scotty McCreery	American Idol season 10	Walt Disney World	
2012	Eli Manning (New York Giants)	Super Bowl XLVI	Walt Disney World	
2013	Joe Flacco (Baltimore Ravens)	Super Bowl XLVII	Walt Disney World and Disneyland	
2014	Malcolm Smith (Seattle Seahawks)	Super Bowl XLVIII	Walt Disney World	
2015	Malcolm Butler and Julian Edelman (New England Patriots)	Super Bowl XLIX	Disneyland	
2016	Peyton Manning (Denver Broncos)	Super Bowl 50	Disneyland	
2018	Nick Foles (Philadelphia Eagles)	Super Bowl LII	Walt Disney World	
2019	Tom Brady and Julian Edelman (New England Patriots)	Super Bowl LIII	Walt Disney World	
2020	Patrick Mahomes (Kansas City Chiefs)	Super Bowl LIV	Walt Disney World	
2021	Tom Brady and Rob Gronkowski (Tampa Bay Buccaneers)	Super Bowl LV	Walt Disney World	
2022	Matthew Stafford, Cooper Kupp and Aaron Donald (Los Angeles Rams)	Super Bowl LVI	Disneyland	
2023	Patrick Mahomes (Kansas City Chiefs)	Super Bowl LVII	Disneyland	
2024	Patrick Mahomes (Kansas City Chiefs)	Super Bowl LVIII	Disneyland	
2025	Jalen Hurts (Philadelphia Eagles)	Super Bowl LIX	Walt Disney World	
2026	Sam Darnold and Kenneth Walker III (Seattle Seahawks)	Super Bowl LX	Disneyland	
