= George Blaha =

American sportscaster

- Born: March 26, 1945 (age 81); Detroit, Michigan, U.S.
- Education: University of Notre Dame; University of Michigan
- Occupation: Sportscaster
- Years active: 1976–present
- Spouse: Mary Blaha

George Blaha (born March 26, 1945) is an American broadcaster. He has been the radio and television play-by-play voice of the Detroit Pistons since the 1976–77 NBA season.

Blaha is the lead play-by-play man on FanDuel Sports Network, also doing radio play-by-play during nationally televised games in place of the Pistons' regular radio play-by-play man Mark Champion. He was also the play-by-play voice of the Michigan State Spartans football team.

== Early life ==
Blaha was born in Detroit, Michigan, and grew up in Marshalltown, Iowa before moving to Grayling, Michigan at age thirteen. He earned a bachelor's degree in economics from the University of Notre Dame in 1966 and an MBA from the University of Michigan.

== Career ==
Before the 1976–1977 season, Blaha succeeded Don Howe on WJR's radio broadcast of the Pistons, and announced his first NBA game from Cobo Arena on October 23, 1976, teaming with Tom Hemingway. He has had a variety of color analysts including former Detroit Pistons players John Mengelt, Dave Bing, Vinnie Johnson, Kelly Tripucka, Bill Laimbeer, Rick Mahorn, and current partner Greg Kelser.

In 2002, Blaha was the recipient of the Ty Tyson Award for Excellence in Sports Broadcasting, awarded by the Detroit Sports Media Association. In 2008, he was elected to the Michigan Sports Hall of Fame and was inducted on September 13, 2010.

In addition to Pistons games, Blaha is the radio voice of the Michigan State Spartans football team. He was the voice of Michigan State Spartans men's basketball during the 2000–2001 season.

Blaha also does Detroit area TV and radio commercials for several companies. He is an active member of the Detroit Sports Media Association, founded in 1948 by pioneer Detroit Tigers announcer Ty Tyson.

== Broadcasting style ==
Blaha has coined several phrases to describe the action on the court, including "from behind the long line" or "the long gun" to describe a 3-point shot, and his signature call "count that baby and a foul" for a Pistons basket made while the shooter is fouled. He almost always uses the Pistons' first names when describing the action on the court. He also uses players' nicknames often, such as members of the 1988–1989 and 1989–1990 "Bad Boys" teams: "The Worm" for Dennis Rodman and "The Microwave" for Vinnie Johnson, or for other Pistons players: "Rip" for Richard Hamilton, "Dunkin Darvin" for Darvin Ham and "Big Ben" for Ben Wallace. He also often introduces his TV partner Greg Kelser as "Special K", his nickname when he was a player.

== Personal life ==
Blaha lives in Troy, Michigan with his wife Mary.
