= Mark Champion =

American sportscaster (born 1950)

- Born: August 8, 1950 (age 75); Muncie, Indiana, U.S.
- Sports commentary career
- Team(s): Tampa Bay Buccaneers (1979–1988); Detroit Lions (1989–2004); Detroit Fury (2001–2004); Detroit Pistons (2001–present)
- Genre: Play-by-play
- Sport(s): National Football League; Arena Football League; National Basketball Association

Mark Champion (born August 8, 1950) is an American radio sportscaster who is the current primary radio play-by-play voice of the Detroit Pistons, a position he has served in since 2001. When the Pistons are on national television, however, George Blaha (usually the TV play-by-play man for FanDuel Sports Network Detroit) takes his place.

Born in Muncie, Indiana and educated at Ball State University, Champion served as a local sports reporter on Tampa-area radio and television stations in the 1970s. In 1979, he became the radio play-by-play announcer for the Tampa Bay Buccaneers.

After a decade-long stint at Tampa Bay, Champion moved to the Detroit area in 1989, calling games for the Detroit Lions (1989–2004), Detroit Pistons (2001–present), Detroit Fury (2001–2004), and Michigan State Spartans men's basketball. In 2004, Champion was the recipient of the prestigious Ty Tyson Award for Excellence in Sports Broadcasting, awarded by the Detroit Sports Broadcasters Association.

In 2005, Champion was replaced on the Lions radio broadcasts with Dan Miller, who was sports director of Fox 2 Detroit television and, more significantly, a friend of Matt Millen, the Lions' general manager at that time. This drew accusations from Detroit media critics that the Lions had installed a "company man" to replace Champion for possibly saying "Holy Mackerel" too frequently and for criticizing the Lions' performance too bluntly (Link NSFW).

Champion (or rather, his voice) is perhaps best recognized for the post-Super Bowl television commercials he does for Walt Disney World each year. The ads, which have aired since 1987, feature an offscreen Champion telling the game's MVP, "_____ , you've just won the Super Bowl. What are you going to do next?" To which the player invariably replies, "I'm going to Disney World!".

Mark Champion in 2010 entered his 17th season as radio play-by-play voice of the Detroit Pistons. He has also worked with Westwood One as a national radio voice for NFL games and NCAA men's basketball tournament games. Champion was an anchor for CBS Radio coverage of the 1992, 1994, and 1998 Winter Olympics, and has been an announcer for the Masters, Ryder Cup, and PGA Championship.

Champion was the voice of the Tampa Bay Buccaneers for ten seasons and for sixteen years lead voice of the Detroit Lions. He called every run ever made by Hall Of Fame running back Barry Sanders. Champion was sports director at WWJ in Detroit and was part of the Bill Bonds Show on WXYT. He has been honored by the National Sportscasters Association and is a recipient of the Ty Tyson Award handed out by the Detroit Sports Broadcasters Association. Champion currently resides in Michigan. He has three children, Nicole, Carly and Evan Champion and two stepchildren and two grandchildren.

== Catchphrases ==
When announcing Lions football, Champion's signature catchphrases were "It's off to the races!" (used when Barry Sanders made a long run), "How about that?!" (whenever the Lions made a big play), "Holy mackerel!" (which could be uttered in jubilation or dismay, depending on the circumstances), and "Man, oh, man!" (after a referee made a bad call or the Lions' opponent made a big play).
