= Prime Minister's Club Award =

- Awarded for: philanthropy to secure the financial stability and future of the state
- Country: Israel
- Presented by: Prime Minister of the State of Israel

The Prime Minister's Club Award was created by then Prime Minister of the state of Israel Golda Meir, for the purpose of honoring and recognizing the philanthropic deeds of those who were friends of the state of Israel and who helped secure the financial stability and future of the state.

The first recipients of the award were William M. Davidson, a businessman, Lloyd J. Paul, a physician, both natives of Detroit, and Israel Zycer, a Holocaust survivor and Chilean businessman, all lifelong donors to Israel and Jewish causes.
