= Guardian Industries =

American manufacturing company

- Type: Subsidiary
- Industry: Glass, Automotive, and Building Products Distribution
- Founded: 1932; 94 years ago
- Headquarters: Auburn Hills, Michigan, U.S.
- Number of locations: 148
- Key people: Merritt Gaunt
- Products: Coated, Flat, Insulated, Laminated, and Tempered Glass; Automotive Interior and Exterior Components, Subsystems, and Motorcycle and Commercial Trim Components
- Number of employees: 18,000
- Parent: Koch Industries (2017–present)
- Divisions: Guardian Building Products; Guardian Glass; SRG Global
- Website: www.guardian.com

Guardian Industries is a privately held industrial manufacturer of glass, automotive and building products based in Auburn Hills, Michigan. The company manufactures float glass, fabricated glass products, fiberglass insulation and building materials for commercial, residential and automotive applications. The company employs more than 18,000 people and has present activities in North and South America, Europe, Asia, and Africa.

== History ==
Guardian Industries was founded in 1932 as Guardian Glass Company. The company was originally established as a small windshield fabricator in Michigan. In 1957, the same year Guardian filed for bankruptcy, Bill Davidson became president of Guardian. He was a nephew of the company's owner. After three years, in 1960, Guardian came out of bankruptcy. In 1968, the company officially changed its name to Guardian Industries Corp. and under William Davidson's leadership, they went public with the initial trade valued at $17 a share. The following year Guardian began trading on the American Stock Exchange.

In 1970, Guardian started producing flat glass with the newly invented float glass process. They opened their first production line in Carleton, Michigan and today the company counts 28 float glass lines and 13 glass fabrication plants around the world. In 1973, it began trading on the New York Stock Exchange. From on 1980, Guardian started to diversify its activities and began producing fiberglass insulation. The European market entry took place in 1981, when the company opened their production line in Bascharage, Luxembourg. Further plants came up in Germany, Spain, England, Hungary and Poland. The company went back to a privately held company in 1985, after 17 years as a public company.

In the 1990s, Guardian could note down an upswing both in the sectors construction materials and automotive products due to several takeovers and acquisitions: Automotive Moulding Company Warren, Michigan; Lab. Radio from Valencia, Spain; Builder Marts of America (BMA) and Cameron Ashley Building Products (which is now the Guardian Building Products Distribution) in 2000. In 1995, corporate headquarters moved from Novi to their present location in Auburn Hills, Michigan.

The takeover of Siegel-Robert Automotive in 2008, led to the formation of SRG Global.

On February 1, 2017, Koch Industries completed its acquisition of Guardian Industries.
