= Bill Davidson (businessman) =

American businessman (1922–2009)

- Born: William Morse Davidson; December 5, 1922; Detroit, Michigan, U.S.
- Died: March 13, 2009 (aged 86); Bloomfield Hills, Michigan, U.S.
- Education: University of Michigan (BA); Wayne State University (JD)
- Occupation: Businessman
- Known for: CEO of Guardian Industries; Owner of the Detroit Pistons; Owner of the Tampa Bay Lightning
- Spouse(s): multiple, Karen Weidman (m. 1995)
- Children: 2
- Military career
- Branch: United States Navy

William Morse Davidson (December 5, 1922 – March 13, 2009) was an American businessman. He was president, chairman and CEO of Guardian Industries, one of the world's largest manufacturers of architectural and automotive glass. He was also owner of several North American professional sports teams and a member of the Naismith Memorial Basketball Hall of Fame.

The chairman of Palace Sports and Entertainment, Davidson was principal owner of the Detroit Pistons of the National Basketball Association, the Detroit Shock of the Women's National Basketball Association, and the co-owner of the Detroit Fury of the Arena Football League. Davidson also owned the Tampa Bay Lightning of the National Hockey League and Detroit Vipers of the International Hockey League. His Pistons won the NBA Finals in 1989, 1990 and 2004; his Shock won the WNBA Finals in 2003, 2006 and 2008; his Vipers won the 1997 Turner Cup; and his Tampa Bay Lightning won the 2004 Stanley Cup.

== Early life and education ==
A Detroit native, Davidson was born to a Jewish family on December 5, 1922; he was a 1940 graduate of Central High School. Davidson entered the University of Michigan in 1940, where he was a member of the track and field team; he majored in business at what is now the Ross School of Business. Davidson later joined the U.S. Navy and played Armed Forces Football during World War II.

Following the war, Davidson garnered his Juris Doctor degree from Wayne State University Law School in 1949. After three years of law practice, he rescued a wholesale drug company and a surgical supply company from bankruptcy.

== Career ==
=== Early career and family business ===
Davidson took over his family's Guardian Glass Co. in 1957, the same year the company declared bankruptcy. Guardian Glass would be the precursor to his company Guardian Industries, one of the largest glass suppliers in the world. Davidson encouraged risk-taking, discouraged second-guessing and was seen as aggressive. Not without controversy, Guardian was sued at least six times between 1965 and 1988. In 1989, Guardian was ordered to pay its competitor Johns Manville $38 million for stealing fibreglass-making technology. Guardian now stands as one of the world's giants of glass manufacturing with facilities in Asia, Europe, Africa and South America in addition to its sprawling North American interests.

=== Pistons ownership ===
Being acquainted with football, Davidson wanted to acquire a football franchise. In 1974, Davidson and college classmate Oscar Feldman enlisted ex-Detroit Lions great Joe Schmidt to be part of a group bidding on the Tampa expansion franchise. The expansion fee soon grew too high for the group's liking, and it bowed out of the bidding.

Two months later, Davidson learned that Pistons owner Fred Zollner was thinking of putting the team up for sale. Zollner had founded the Pistons in Fort Wayne, Indiana in 1941 and moved them to Detroit in 1957. However, the Pistons had never turned a profit since the move to Detroit. Davidson and Zollner had known each other for some time, since they both had vacation homes in Golden Beach, Florida. Zollner quickly reached a deal to sell the Pistons to Davidson for $6 million, which closed in late 1974.

At the time, the Pistons played at 10,000-seat Cobo Arena in downtown Detroit. Davidson was displeased with this location, but opted not to join the Detroit Red Wings at the under-construction Joe Louis Arena. Instead, he relocated the team to the Pontiac Silverdome in 1978 and then to The Palace of Auburn Hills, the first NBA arena financed entirely with private funds, in 1988. To help pay the $90 million construction cost, the Bob Sosnick-designed arena featured lower-level suites, then a never-seen-before feature.

His Pistons were at the league's forefront with respect to amenities. The franchise has a state-of-the-art practice facility, solely designed for the Pistons. During the offseason, team members are able to use the facilities while working on personal off-season conditioning goals. Against the advice of friends, Davidson was also the first owner to buy an airplane for his team, nicknamed Roundball One. Roundball Two, a newer, larger, multimillion-dollar aircraft refurbished with 42 luxury seats and a state-of-the-art video system, was purchased in the summer of 1998. Davidson was also the first to encourage globalizing the marketing of the NBA. He has been chairman of the Board of Governors and was active on several committees, including the one that selected former NBA Commissioner Larry O'Brien in 1975.

In 2009, the value of the Pistons franchise was estimated to be over $430 million. Regularly seen at the team's home games, Davidson had said repeatedly that he would never sell the Pistons and the franchise would remain in his family after he died.

In 1999, Davidson put in an unsuccessful bid to purchase the Tampa Bay Lightning and gain a controlling interest in their home arena, the Ice Palace. He lost to insurance tycoon Art Williams, but only months later Williams sold the team to Davidson and Palace Sports at a huge loss. When Davidson acquired the Lightning franchise in 1999, the price was $100 million; its value has recently been estimated at $136 million. Tampa Bay won the Stanley Cup under Davidson's ownership in 2004. On August 7, 2007, Davidson sold the Lightning franchise.

Davidson was honored by the Pistons in 2006 when he was given a banner next to the team's retired numbers. His name (as "Bill Davidson") was also placed on the Palace floor along with Pistons legends Dave Bing, Bill Laimbeer, Vinnie Johnson, Chuck Daly, Joe Dumars, Isiah Thomas and Bob Lanier.

In 2008, Davidson was elected to the Naismith Memorial Basketball Hall of Fame as a contributor for his successes as an owner of the Pistons and Shock. He was also an inaugural inductee into the Jewish Sports Hall of Fame.

At the time of his death, Davidson lived in Bloomfield Hills, Michigan with his wife, Karen. He had two children, Ethan and Marla, and three stepdaughters, including actress Elizabeth Reaser.

His combined business ventures led him to an estimated net worth of $3.5 billion, which led to Forbes ranking him as the 68th-richest man in the United States.

== Philanthropic activities ==
A noted philanthropist, Davidson gave extensively to various organizations. He was one of the founders of the Pistons/Palace Foundation, a charity that has donated more than $20 million in cash and merchandise since 1989. In 1995, the foundation partnered with the City of Detroit's Parks and Recreation Department to establish the Partnership to Adopt and Renovate Parks for Kids (PARK) Program, which provided restoration of Detroit parks, basketball courts, baseball diamonds, running tracks and playground equipment.

In 1992, the William Davidson Institute at the University of Michigan was created at Davidson's alma mater, the Ross School of Business. A gift of $30 million was given to provide assistance in a special program to help develop market economies throughout the world. In total, Davidson's gifts to the school exceed $55 million.

In 1997, the Council of Michigan Foundations honored Davidson for his lifelong philanthropic efforts locally, nationally and internationally. He was listed as one of America's most generous donors in a New York Times article that same year.

Davidson enabled the Detroit Symphony Orchestra to make long-term touring plans both in the U.S. and internationally with a renewable $2 million donation. He pledged to fight cancer with a gift of $1 million to support collaborative research, prevention and early detection programs in breast and pediatric cancers at the Karmanos Cancer Institute and Children's Research Center of Michigan.

After the Yom Kippur War, he and fellow Detroit-area philanthropist Lloyd J. Paul were flown to Israel by Prime Minister Golda Meir and given the Prime Minister's Club Award for outstanding philanthropic deeds towards Israel. In 1999, Davidson gave $20 million to establish the Davidson Institute of Science Education at the Weizmann Institute of Science in Rehovot, Israel. This was then the largest private donation ever given to the institute, a leading international science research center and graduate school. Davidson later added another gift of $15 million to the same institute. In addition, he endowed the William Davidson Graduate School of Jewish Education at the Jewish Theological Seminary of America in New York with a $15 million gift. The excavations on the southern wall of the Temple Mount in Jerusalem have been named the Davidson excavations in tribute to his generous donations to the project. He also gave to the American Technion Society to establish the world's first educational institution entirely dedicated to the international management of technology-based companies at the Technion – Israel Institute of Technology. Davidson was also a contributor to the Wexner Foundation which gives grants to graduate students of Jewish studies. In March 2007, Davidson donated $75 million to the Hadassah Ein Kerem Hospital in Jerusalem.

== Awards and recognition ==
Davidson was decorated as Commander of the Order of the Oak Crown and as Grand Officer of the Order of Merit of the Grand Duchy of Luxembourg.

== Personal life ==
Davidson was married four times. He had two children:

- Ethan Daniel Davidson, a musician, who is married to fellow musician Gretchen Gonzales. He is active with the William Davidson Foundation.
- Marla Davidson Karimipour, married to Cyrus Karimipour.

In 1995, he married his fourth wife, Karen Weidman, who would convert to Judaism upon their marriage. She has three daughters from a prior marriage to John Reaser: Elizabeth Reaser, an actress with 30 movies and television shows to her credit (including the Twilight saga); Emily Reaser; and Mary Aaron.

The book The Wetsmans: Odyssey of an American Family was commissioned in 1988 by William M. Davidson, a grandson in the Wetsmans' family. For more information about the Wetsmans and their extended family, the book has been digitized and is available online.

=== Death ===
Davidson died on March 13, 2009, in his home at the age of 86. His health had been deteriorating for the years before his death; he had been using a wheelchair and very infrequently attended Pistons home games. The funeral was held at Congregation Shaarey Zedek, in Southfield, and Davidson was buried in the Clover Hill Park Cemetery, in Birmingham.

His widow Karen succeeded him as owner of the Pistons, and she sold all of Palace Sports & Entertainment, including the Pistons franchise, to Platinum Equity founder Tom Gores in 2011 for a reported $325 million.

== See also ==
- List of University of Michigan alumni
- The World's Billionaires

Sporting positions
Preceded by Fred Zollner	Detroit Pistons owner 1974–2009	Succeeded by Karen Davidson
Preceded by Arthur L. Williams Jr.	Tampa Bay Lightning owner 1999–2008	Succeeded by Oren Koules
