= List of Detroit Tigers broadcasters =

The following is a list of Detroit Tigers broadcasters, past and present:

== Radio ==
=== Current ===
The current flagship radio station for the Tigers is WXYT-FM, at 97.1 FM. Dan Dickerson calls play-by-play. Bobby Scales and Andy Dirks rotate as the primary color analysts as of the 2024 season. The games are available online as well via Audacy. If a scheduling conflict occurs, WWJ is a substitute for its sister station.

=== Former flagships ===
WJR was the Tigers' radio flagship from 1964 to 2000. Other former Tigers flagships include WXYT (currently known as "The Bet Detroit") and WKMH (currently known as WDTW).

=== Former radio announcers ===
- Ty Tyson (1927–1942, 1951)
- Harry Heilmann (1934–1950)
- Paul Williams (1951)
- Van Patrick (1952–1959)
- Dizzy Trout (1953–1955)
- Mel Ott (1956–1958)
- George Kell (1959–1963)
- Ernie Harwell (1960–1991, 1993, 1999–2002)
- Bob Scheffing (1964)
- Gene Osborn (1965–1966)
- Ray Lane (1967–1972)
- Paul Carey (1973–1991)
- Rick Rizzs (1992–1994)
- Bob Rathbun (1992–1994)
- Frank Beckmann (1995–1998)
- Lary Sorensen (1995–1998)
- Jim Price (1998–2023)
- Al Kaline (2009, substitute analyst for select road games)
- John Keating (2009, substitute analyst for select road games)
- Dan Petry (2012, 2019, 2021–2022, substitute analyst for select games)
- Ken Kal (2013, 2016, 2018, substitute play-by-play for select games)
- Dan Hasty (2018–2025, alternate play-by-play)
- Austin Jackson (2021–2022, substitute analyst for select road games)
- Craig Monroe (2021–2023, substitute analyst for select road games)
- Alex Avila (2022, substitute analyst for select road games)
- Doug Fister (2022, substitute analyst for road doubleheader)

=== 2020s ===
Year	Flagship stations	Play-by-Play	Color Commentary
2024	WXYT-FM	Dan Dickerson (primary); Greg Gania (substitute)	Andy Dirks (home); Bobby Scales (away)
2023	WXYT-FM	Dan Dickerson	Jim Price
2022	WXYT-FM	Dan Dickerson	Jim Price
2021	WXYT-FM	Dan Dickerson	Jim Price
2020	WXYT-FM	Dan Dickerson	Jim Price

=== 2010s ===
Year	Flagship stations	Play-by-Play	Color Commentary
2019	WXYT-FM	Dan Dickerson	Jim Price
2018	WXYT-FM	Dan Dickerson	Jim Price
2017	WXYT-FM	Dan Dickerson	Jim Price
2016	WXYT-FM	Dan Dickerson	Jim Price
2015	WXYT-FM	Dan Dickerson	Jim Price
2014	WXYT-FM	Dan Dickerson	Jim Price
2013	WXYT-FM	Dan Dickerson	Jim Price
2012	WXYT-FM	Dan Dickerson	Jim Price
2011	WXYT-FM	Dan Dickerson	Jim Price
2010	WXYT-FM	Dan Dickerson	Jim Price

=== 2000s ===
Year	Flagship stations	Play-by-Play	Color Commentary
2009	WXYT-FM	Dan Dickerson	Jim Price
2008	WXYT-FM	Dan Dickerson	Jim Price
2007	WXYT	Dan Dickerson	Jim Price
2006	WXYT	Dan Dickerson	Jim Price
2005	WXYT	Dan Dickerson	Jim Price
2004	WXYT	Dan Dickerson	Jim Price
2003	WXYT	Dan Dickerson	Jim Price
2002	WXYT	Ernie Harwell; Dan Dickerson	Jim Price
2001	WXYT	Ernie Harwell; Dan Dickerson	Jim Price
2000	WJR	Ernie Harwell; Dan Dickerson	Jim Price

=== 1990s ===
Year	Flagship stations	Play-by-Play	Color Commentary/Secondary Play-by-Play
1999	WJR	Ernie Harwell	Jim Price
1998	WJR	Frank Beckmann	Lary Sorensen (April–June); Jim Price (June–September)
1997	WJR	Frank Beckmann	Lary Sorensen
1996	WJR	Frank Beckmann	Lary Sorensen
1995	WJR	Frank Beckmann	Lary Sorensen
1994	WJR	Rick Rizzs	Bob Rathbun
1993	WJR	Rick Rizzs; Ernie Harwell	Bob Rathbun
1992	WJR	Rick Rizzs	Bob Rathbun
1991	WJR	Ernie Harwell	Paul Carey
1990	WJR	Ernie Harwell	Paul Carey

=== 1980s ===
Year	Flagship stations	Play-by-Play	Color Commentary/Secondary Play-by-Play
1989	WJR	Ernie Harwell	Paul Carey
1988	WJR	Ernie Harwell	Paul Carey
1987	WJR	Ernie Harwell	Paul Carey
1986	WJR	Ernie Harwell	Paul Carey
1985	WJR	Ernie Harwell	Paul Carey
1984	WJR	Ernie Harwell	Paul Carey
1983	WJR	Ernie Harwell	Paul Carey
1982	WJR	Ernie Harwell	Paul Carey
1981	WJR	Ernie Harwell	Paul Carey
1980	WJR	Ernie Harwell	Paul Carey

=== 1970s ===
Year	Flagship stations	Play-by-Play	Color Commentary/Secondary Play-by-Play
1979	WJR	Ernie Harwell	Paul Carey
1978	WJR	Ernie Harwell	Paul Carey
1977	WJR	Ernie Harwell	Paul Carey
1976	WJR	Ernie Harwell	Paul Carey
1975	WJR	Ernie Harwell	Paul Carey
1974	WJR	Ernie Harwell	Paul Carey
1973	WJR	Ernie Harwell	Paul Carey
1972	WJR	Ernie Harwell	Ray Lane
1971	WJR	Ernie Harwell	Ray Lane
1970	WJR	Ernie Harwell	Ray Lane

=== 1960s ===
Year	Flagship stations	Play-by-Play	Color Commentary/Secondary Play-by-Play
1969	WJR	Ernie Harwell	Ray Lane
1968	WJR	Ernie Harwell	Ray Lane
1967	WJR	Ernie Harwell	Ray Lane
1966	WJR	Ernie Harwell	Gene Osborn
1965	WJR	Ernie Harwell	Gene Osborn
1964	WJR	Ernie Harwell	Bob Scheffing
1963	WKMH	George Kell	Ernie Harwell
1962	WKMH	George Kell	Ernie Harwell
1961	WKMH	George Kell	Ernie Harwell
1960	WKMH	George Kell	Ernie Harwell

=== 1950s ===
Year	Flagship stations	Play-by-Play	Color Commentary/Secondary Play-by-Play
1959	WKMH	Van Patrick	George Kell
1958	WKMH	Van Patrick	Mel Ott
1957	WKMH	Van Patrick	Mel Ott
1956	WKMH	Van Patrick	Mel Ott
1955	WKMH	Van Patrick	Dizzy Trout
1954	WKMH	Van Patrick	Dizzy Trout
1953	WKMH	Van Patrick	Dizzy Trout
1952	WKMH	Van Patrick
1951	WXYZ	Ty Tyson	Paul Williams
1950	WXYZ	Harry Heilmann

== Television ==
=== Current ===
The television rights are currently held by Detroit SportsNet after Bally Sports Detroit (formerly Fox Sports Detroit) closed shop at the end of the 2025-26 NBA season. Jason Benetti serves as the primary play-by-play announcer beginning in 2024, while Andy Dirks and Dan Petry rotate as primary analysts.

Pre-game and post-game show hosts and reporters include John Keating, Mickey York, Trevor Thompson, Justin White, Cameron Maybin, and Johnny Kane, while Dan Petry provides studio analysis.

=== Former TV outlets ===
The Tigers have spent most of their broadcast televised history across two of Detroit's heritage "Big Three" network stations, WJBK (Channel 2, Fox; formerly with CBS from 1948 to 1994) and WDIV (Channel 4, NBC; originally WWJ-TV from 1947 to 1978), as well as two of the market's former legacy independent stations, WMYD (Channel 20, formerly WXON-TV and WDWB) and WKBD (Channel 50). Channel 4 was the original Tiger television outlet, carrying games from 1947 to 1952, and again for a twenty-season run from 1975 to 1994. Channel 4, at least during a time when NBC's ratings were sagging during the late 1970s to the mid-1980s, was one of a handful of the network's affiliates that was either a primary outlet or an affiliate of the local/regional baseball team.

Significant in the Tiger broadcasting network were television stations owned by Tigers' owner John Fetzer, including WKZO-TV (now WWMT) in Kalamazoo, WLNS in Lansing, WJRT in Flint, WWTV and WWUP-TV in northern Michigan, and even some television stations in Nebraska, namely KOLN-TV in Lincoln and its satellite in Grand Island, Nebraska.

WJBK took over the Tigers telecasts starting with the 1953 season, and carried games until the end of the 1974 season; since 2007, the station simulcasts the team's home opener each season from Fox Sports Detroit. WKBD, for many years known as Detroit's leading independent TV station, as well as the longtime over-the-air TV home of the Red Wings and Pistons, televised Tigers games starting in 1995 (when it was an UPN owned-and-operated station) until 2003. WMYD televised selected Tigers games only for the 2006 season, and as WXON-TV and the local affiliate of the ONTV subscription TV service, Channel 20 also showed the team's games from 1981 to 1983.

Pro-Am Sports System (PASS), originally started in 1982, became the regional cable outlet for the Tigers starting in 1984, after the network was purchased by then-Tigers team owner Tom Monaghan. Monaghan sold PASS to Post-Newsweek Stations (now Graham Media Group) in 1992, after he sold the Tigers to local pizza magnate and Red Wings owner Mike Ilitch. PASS, thereafter, re-located its operations to the WDIV studio/office facility in Downtown Detroit. PASS shut down operations in 1997, after the Red Wings, Tigers, and Pistons all elected to sign-with and helped launch Fox Sports Detroit.

=== Former TV announcers ===
- Ty Tyson (1947–1952)
- Harry Heilmann (1947–1950)
- Van Patrick (1953–1959)
- Dizzy Trout (1953–1955)
- Mel Ott (1956–1958)
- George Kell (1959–1963, 1965–1996)
- Ernie Harwell (1960–1964, 1994–1998)
- Bob Scheffing (1964)
- Ray Lane (1965–1966, 1999–2003)
- Larry Osterman (1967–1977, 1984–1992)
- Don Kremer (1975–1976)
- Al Kaline (1976–2001)
- Joe Pellegrino (1977–1978)
- Mike Barry (1978–1979)
- Larry Adderley (1981–1983)
- Hank Aguirre (1981–1983)
- Norm Cash (1981–1983)
- Bill Freehan (1984–1985)
- Jim Northrup (1985–1994)
- Jim Price (1993–1997)
- Fred McLeod (1995–1997)
- Josh Lewin (1998–2001)
- Frank Beckmann (1999–2003)
- Tom Paciorek (2000)
- Lance Parrish (2002)
- Mario Impemba (2002–2018)
- Rod Allen (2003–2018)
- Jack Morris (2015–2016, 2019–2022)
- Matt Shepard (2019–2023)

=== 2020s ===
Year	Network	Play-by-Play	Color Commentary	Pre-Game Host
2024	Bally Sports Detroit	Jason Benetti; Dan Dickerson	Craig Monroe; Carlos Peña	John Keating, Mickey York, Trevor Thompson, Justin White, Cameron Maybin, Dan Petry, Johnny Kane
2023	Bally Sports Detroit	Matt Shepard	Craig Monroe, Kirk Gibson, Austin Jackson, Dan Petry, Cameron Maybin, Todd Jones	John Keating, Mickey York, Trevor Thompson, Johnny Kane, Natalie Kerwin, Dannie Rogers, Dan Petry, Cameron Maybin, Todd Jones
2022	Bally Sports Detroit	Matt Shepard	Kirk Gibson, Jack Morris, Austin Jackson, Craig Monroe, Dan Petry	John Keating, Mickey York, Trevor Thompson, Brooke Fletcher, Craig Monroe, Johnny Kane, Dan Petry
2021	Bally Sports Detroit	Matt Shepard	Kirk Gibson; Jack Morris	John Keating, Mickey York, Trevor Thompson, Craig Monroe, Johnny Kane, Kristen Keith
2020	Fox Sports Detroit	Matt Shepard	Kirk Gibson; Jack Morris	John Keating, Mickey York, Trevor Thompson, Craig Monroe, Johnny Kane, Kristen Keith

=== 2010s ===
Year
Network
Play-by-Play
Color Commentary
Pre-Game Host
2019
Fox Sports Go

Fox Sports Detroit

Matt Shepard
Kirk Gibson, Jack Morris
John Keating, Mickey York, Trevor Thompson, Craig Monroe, Johnny Kane, Kristen Keith
2018
Mario Impemba
Matt Shepard
Rod Allen (select games), Kirk Gibson (select games)
John Keating, Mickey York, Trevor Thompson, Justin White, Craig Monroe, Johnny Kane, Kristen Keith
2017
Mario Impemba
2016
Rod Allen (select games), Kirk Gibson (select games), Jack Morris (select games)
John Keating, Mickey York, Trevor Thompson, Justin White, Craig Monroe, Johnny Kane
2015
Fox Sports Detroit
John Keating, Mickey York, Trevor Thompson, Justin White, Craig Monroe
2014
Rod Allen
2013
John Keating, Mickey York, Ryan Field, Trevor Thompson, Justin White, Craig Monroe
2012
John Keating, Mickey York, Ryan Field, Trevor Thompson, Craig Monroe
2011
John Keating, Mickey York, Ryan Field, Trevor Thompson
2010

=== 2000s ===
Year	Network	Play-by-Play	Color Commentary	Pre-Game Host
2009	Fox Sports Detroit	Mario Impemba	Rod Allen	John Keating, Mickey York, Ryan Field, Trevor Thompson
2008	Fox Sports Detroit	Mario Impemba	Rod Allen	John Keating, Mickey York, Ryan Field, Trevor Thompson
2007	Fox Sports Detroit; WJBK	Mario Impemba	Rod Allen	John Keating; None
2006	Fox Sports Detroit; WMYD	Mario Impemba	Rod Allen	John Keating; None
2005	Fox Sports Detroit	Mario Impemba	Rod Allen	John Keating
2004	Fox Sports Detroit	Mario Impemba	Rod Allen	John Keating
2003	Fox Sports Detroit; WKBD-TV	Mario Impemba; Frank Beckmann	Rod Allen; Jack Morris	John Keating; Ray Lane
2002	Fox Sports Detroit; WKBD-TV	Mario Impemba; Frank Beckmann	Kirk Gibson; Lance Parrish	John Keating; Ray Lane
2001	Fox Sports Detroit; WKBD-TV	Josh Lewin; Frank Beckmann	Kirk Gibson; Al Kaline	John Keating; Ray Lane
2000	Fox Sports Detroit; WKBD-TV	Josh Lewin; Frank Beckmann	Kirk Gibson, Tom Paciorek; Al Kaline	John Keating; Ray Lane

=== 1990s ===
Year	Network	Play-by-Play	Color Commentary	Pre-Game Host
1999	Fox Sports Detroit; WKBD-TV	Josh Lewin; Frank Beckmann	Kirk Gibson; Al Kaline	John Keating; Ray Lane
1998	Fox Sports Detroit; WKBD-TV	Josh Lewin; Ernie Harwell	Kirk Gibson; Al Kaline	John Keating; Ray Lane
1997	Fox Sports Detroit; WKBD-TV	Ernie Harwell	Jim Price and Fred McLeod; Al Kaline and Jim Price	John Keating; Ray Lane
1996	PASS Sports; WKBD-TV	Ernie Harwell; George Kell	Jim Price and Fred McLeod; Al Kaline	John Keating; Ray Lane
1995	PASS Sports; WKBD-TV	Ernie Harwell; George Kell	Jim Price and Fred McLeod; Al Kaline	John Keating; Ray Lane
1994	PASS Sports; WDIV-TV	Ernie Harwell; George Kell	Jim Price and Jim Northrup; Al Kaline	John Keating; Van Earl Wright
1993	PASS Sports; WDIV-TV	Jim Price; George Kell	Jim Northrup; Al Kaline	John Keating; Bernie Smilovitz
1992	PASS Sports; WDIV-TV	Larry Osterman; George Kell	Jim Northrup; Al Kaline	Pat Caputo; Bernie Smilovitz
1991	PASS Sports; WDIV-TV	Larry Osterman; George Kell	Jim Northrup; Al Kaline	Pat Caputo; Bernie Smilovitz
1990	PASS Sports; WDIV-TV	Larry Osterman; George Kell	Jim Northrup; Al Kaline	Pat Caputo; Bernie Smilovitz

=== 1980s ===
Year	Network	Play-by-Play	Color Commentary
1989	PASS Sports; WDIV-TV	Larry Osterman; George Kell	Jim Northrup; Al Kaline
1988	PASS Sports; WDIV-TV	Larry Osterman; George Kell	Jim Northrup; Al Kaline
1987	PASS Sports; WDIV-TV	Larry Osterman; George Kell	Jim Northrup; Al Kaline
1986	PASS Sports; WDIV-TV	Larry Osterman; George Kell	Jim Northrup; Al Kaline
1985	PASS Sports; WDIV-TV	Larry Osterman; George Kell	Bill Freehan and Jim Northrup; Al Kaline
1984	PASS Sports; WDIV-TV	Larry Osterman; George Kell	Bill Freehan; Al Kaline
1983	ONTV; WDIV-TV	Larry Adderley; George Kell	Norm Cash and Hank Aguirre; Al Kaline
1982	ONTV; WDIV-TV	Larry Adderley; George Kell	Norm Cash and Hank Aguirre; Al Kaline
1981	ONTV; WDIV-TV	Larry Adderley; George Kell	Norm Cash and Hank Aguirre; Al Kaline
1980	WDIV-TV	George Kell	Al Kaline

=== 1970s ===
Year	Network	Play-by-Play	Color Commentary/Secondary Play-by-Play
1979	WDIV-TV	George Kell	Al Kaline and Mike Barry
1978	WWJ-TV	George Kell	Al Kaline, Joe Pellegrino and Mike Barry
1977	WWJ-TV	George Kell	Larry Osterman, Al Kaline and Joe Pellegrino
1976	WWJ-TV	George Kell	Larry Osterman, Don Kremer and Al Kaline
1975	WWJ-TV	George Kell	Larry Osterman and Don Kremer
1974	WJBK	George Kell	Larry Osterman
1973	WJBK	George Kell	Larry Osterman
1972	WJBK	George Kell	Larry Osterman
1971	WJBK	George Kell	Larry Osterman
1970	WJBK	George Kell	Larry Osterman

=== 1960s ===
Year	Network	Play-by-Play	Color Commentary/Secondary Play-by-Play
1969	WJBK	George Kell	Larry Osterman
1968	WJBK	George Kell	Larry Osterman
1967	WJBK	George Kell	Larry Osterman
1966	WJBK	George Kell	Ray Lane
1965	WJBK	George Kell	Ray Lane
1964	WJBK	Ernie Harwell	Bob Scheffing
1963	WJBK	George Kell	Ernie Harwell
1962	WJBK	George Kell	Ernie Harwell
1961	WJBK	George Kell	Ernie Harwell
1960	WJBK	George Kell	Ernie Harwell

=== 1950s ===
Year	Network	Play-by-Play	Color Commentary/Secondary Play-by-Play
1959	WJBK	Van Patrick	George Kell
1958	WJBK	Van Patrick	Mel Ott
1957	WJBK	Van Patrick	Mel Ott
1956	WJBK	Van Patrick	Mel Ott
1955	WJBK	Van Patrick	Dizzy Trout
1954	WJBK	Van Patrick	Dizzy Trout
1953	WWJ-TV	Van Patrick	Dizzy Trout
1952	WWJ-TV	Van Patrick
1951	WWJ-TV	Harry Heilmann	Ty Tyson
1950	WWJ-TV	Harry Heilmann	Ty Tyson
