= Ty Tyson =

American sportscaster (1888–1968)

- Tyson in 1930
- Born: Edwin Lloyd Tyson; May 11, 1888; Phillipsburg, Pennsylvania, U.S.
- Died: December 12, 1968 (aged 80); Grosse Pointe Farms, Michigan, U.S.
- Education: Pennsylvania State University
- Occupation: Broadcaster
- Years active: 1922–1953

Edwin Lloyd "Ty" Tyson (May 11, 1888 – December 12, 1968) was an American sports broadcaster and radio play-by-play announcer.

== Early life ==
Tyson was born in Phillipsburg, Pennsylvania and he attended Penn State University. As a young man, he played baseball and acted in nearby Tyrone, Pennsylvania. While acting in a play, he met another young man from Tyrone, Fred Waring. The two became fast friends. Tyson spent his early years jumping from job to job, including stints in the coal, wallpaper, and papermaking industries, a time in stationery with his father, and as a mercantile appraiser. In addition, he spent two years of World War I in the U.S. Army, including eleven months of that time overseas.

Fred Waring, meanwhile, formed his famous band, the Pennsylvanians, and began touring the country. After playing at the University of Michigan in 1922, Waring was invited to perform on radio station WWJ in Detroit, then just a few months old. Bill Holiday, the station's manager and its first radio announcer, was looking for someone to replace him. Waring suggested Tyson, and Holiday immediately telegraphed a job offer, which Tyson accepted.

== Radio career ==
Tyson handled announcing chores for various events at WWJ, including broadcasting the Detroit Symphony Orchestra and the opening of the Ambassador Bridge and the Detroit-Windsor Tunnel. What he is best known for, however, is his pioneering work on play-by-play of live sports broadcasts for the station.

On October 25, 1924, Tyson broadcast the first University of Michigan football game aired on the radio. Fielding H. Yost had given WWJ permission to broadcast the game against Wisconsin only because the game had been sold out. He was afraid broadcasting would hurt sales, but before the next home game Michigan was inundated with ticket requests. Sensing a good thing, Yost agreed to more broadcasts.

On April 19, 1927, Tyson called his first Detroit Tigers game, inaugurating the first full season of radio broadcasts for a Major League Baseball team. He quickly became a popular figure with the team's fanbase. When the Tigers reached the World Series in 1934, baseball's then-commissioner, Kenesaw Mountain Landis, barred Tyson from appearing on any of the network radio coverage, citing the risk of partiality in his commentary. After Tiger fans sent in more than 600,000 letters of protest, Landis compromised by allowing Tyson to announce the Series locally on WWJ. Tyson went on to call the 1935 Series (which involved the Tigers, and ended in their first-ever world championship) and the 1936 Series nationally for NBC radio, and broadcast the 1941 All-Star Game (played at Detroit's Briggs Stadium) for WWJ.

Tyson continued broadcasting Tigers games on WWJ through 1942; the next year, the team granted exclusive broadcast rights to rival station WXYZ, with Harry Heilmann announcing. For the previous eight years, the Tigers had employed an unusual arrangement for their broadcasts, with Tyson broadcasting to metro Detroit while Heilmann's broadcasts anchored a network that stretched across Michigan. Tyson returned to call the Tigers' television broadcasts in 1947, and shifted back to radio in 1951 after Heilmann developed lung cancer. In 1948, founded the Detroit Sports Broadcasters Association (now the Detroit Sports Media Association) in response to what he considered to be "second-class treatment" toward the broadcasters (by the baseball writers) in the Briggs Stadium pressbox in Detroit, also serving as the organization's first president.

Tyson also called Detroit Lions radio for one season (1951), and broadcast the Gold Cup powerboat races, boxing, and other sporting events in Detroit. He retired from broadcasting in 1953. On Father's Day in 1965, Tyson was invited by the Tigers' then-current radio announcer, Ernie Harwell, to return to the booth as a guest commentator. In 2000, the Detroit Sports Broadcasters Association established an annual Ty Tyson Award for Excellence in Sports Broadcasting. Among its recipients are former Tigers announcers Ernie Harwell, Ray Lane, Paul Carey, Frank Beckmann, Josh Lewin, Mario Impemba, Matt Shepherd and current announcer Dan Dickerson.

Tyson died December 12, 1968, at Cottage Hospital in Grosse Pointe Farms, from an arterial ailment. He was 80 years old. He has been nominated on several occasions posthumously for the National Baseball Hall of Fame and Museum's Ford C. Frick Award and is yet to be named.

== See also ==
- Detroit Tigers/Broadcasters
