= Dan Petry =

American baseball player (born 1958)

- Pitcher
- Born: November 13, 1958 (age 67); Palo Alto, California, U.S.
- Batted: Right Threw: Right

MLB debut
- July 8, 1979, for the Detroit Tigers

Last MLB appearance
- October 5, 1991, for the Boston Red Sox

MLB statistics
- Win–loss record: 125–104
- Earned run average: 3.95
- Strikeouts: 1,063
- Stats at Baseball Reference

Teams
- Detroit Tigers (1979–1987); California Angels (1988–1989); Detroit Tigers (1990–1991); Atlanta Braves (1991); Boston Red Sox (1991)

Career highlights and awards
- All-Star (1985); World Series champion (1984)

Daniel Joseph Petry (/ˈpiːtriː/ PEE-tree; born November 13, 1958) is an American former Major League Baseball pitcher for the Detroit Tigers (1979–87 and 1990–91), California Angels (1988–89), Atlanta Braves (1991) and Boston Red Sox (1991). He currently serves as a broadcast color analyst for the Detroit Tigers Radio Network and Detroit SportsNet. Petry's longtime nickname is "Peaches."

== Playing career ==
Petry helped the Tigers win the 1984 World Series and the 1987 American League Eastern Division, and helped the Braves win the 1991 National League pennant. He was elected to the American League All-Star team in 1985. He led the American League in games started (38) in 1983. In 1982 and 1984, Petry finished ninth and fifth, respectively, in American League Cy Young Award voting.

In 13 years he had a 125-104 record (.546), 370 appearances, 300 games started, 52 complete games, 11 shutouts, one save, 2,080 1/3 innings pitched, 1,984 hits allowed, 1,025 runs allowed, 912 earned runs allowed, 218 home runs allowed, 852 walks allowed, 1,063 strikeouts, 47 hit batsmen, 77 wild pitches, seven balks and a 3.95 earned run average.

Petry only appeared in 13 games as a Red Sox, but in 1991, that is where he ended his career. Used strictly as a relief pitcher, he managed to pick up his one and only MLB save. It came on September 30, 1991 against the Brewers. Petry pitched 1 2/3 scoreless innings to close out a wild 9-8 Red Sox victory over the Brewers.

Defensively, Petry was an above average fielding pitcher, posting a .980 fielding percentage, committing only 12 errors in 603 total chances, which was 23 points higher than the league average at his position.

== Post-playing career ==
In 2012, Petry served as a substitute color analyst for the Detroit Tigers Radio Network, teaming with play-by-play announcer Dan Dickerson for several road games while regular analyst Jim Price recuperated from health problems. In 2022, he resumed filling in for Price while the Tigers were on the road.

On January 15, 2019, Petry was named a studio analyst for the Detroit Tigers on Bally Sports Detroit.

== Personal life ==
Petry and his wife, Christine have two sons, Matt, who was the head coach of the Orchard Lake St. Mary’s baseball team, who have won three Michigan High School Athletic Association championships under Petry, and Jeff, who currently is a defenseman for the Minnesota Wild of the National Hockey League. Petry attended El Dorado High School in Placentia, California, where he was a CIF championship winning pitcher.
