= Pro-Am Sports System =

Former regional sports network in Michigan, United States

- Country: United States
- Broadcast area: Michigan; Northern Indiana; Northwest Ohio; Nationwide (via satellite)
- Network: Prime Network
- Headquarters: Detroit, Michigan

Programming
- Language: English

Ownership
- Owner: John Fetzer (1984–1987); Tom Monaghan (1987–1992); Post-Newsweek Stations (1992–1997)
- Sister channels: Broadcast: WDIV-TV (1992–1997)

History
- Launched: April 17, 1984; 42 years ago
- Closed: November 1, 1997; 28 years ago
- Replaced by: Fox/Bally/FanDuel Sports Network Detroit (1997–2026; de facto replacement); Detroit SportsNet (2026–present)

The Pro-Am Sports System (better known as PASS Sports or simply PASS) was an American regional sports network that operated from 1984 to 1997. It also served as an affiliate of the Prime Network from 1988 to 1996. Based in Detroit, the channel broadcast regional coverage of sports events throughout Michigan, mainly covering professional, collegiate and high school sports in the Metro Detroit area and throughout Michigan. After it lost coverage rights to all major Detroit teams to the new Fox Sports Detroit, it was permanently shut down in 1997.

== History ==
The network launched on April 17, 1984, as one of the first regional sports networks in the United States. PASS was owned by John Fetzer, the Principal owner of the Fetzer broadcast station group. Fetzer was also the previous owner of the Detroit Tigers, having just sold the team months earlier to Domino's Pizza owner Tom Monaghan. For its inaugural year, PASS carried 80 Tigers games (64 home and 16 away) as part of a seven year contract. At its launch it also had an agreement with the Detroit Pistons and to carry a series of local boxing matches. PASS contracted to use WDIV-TV's studios to produce its programming. PASS was offered for $10 per month and marketed using the slogan "Your Season Pass".

In 1986, Detroit Red Wings games were added to the network's sports programming slate, with the remainder of the team's games being shown on independent station WKBD-TV (channel 50). The Red Wings did not join PASS at launch, apparently after Red Wings owner Mike Ilitch—owner of Little Caesars Pizza—was frustrated that he had been bypassed as a buyer for the Tigers in favor of competitor Monaghan. In 1987, Fetzer sold PASS to Tigers owner Tom Monaghan, and in 1988, PASS became an early charter affiliate of the Prime Network group of regional sports networks. Monaghan moved the PASS production offices to Domino's Farms (the Frank Lloyd Wright-inspired Dominos Pizza headquarters) in Ann Arbor, where it was positioned next to Pro-Vision for in-house video production services (for both PASS and Dominos Pizza training videos).

In 1992, Monaghan sold the Tigers to Mike Ilitch and sold PASS to Post-Newsweek Stations. PASS merged its operations with NBC affiliate WDIV-TV (channel 4) and moved its studios and offices from Ann Arbor to WDIV-TV's studios in Detroit. Post-Newsweek also changed it from an evening-only premium cable channel to a basic cable channel and expanded it to 24 hours a day.

In the fall of 1995, PASS expanded its coverage area, adding providers such as C-TEC and Cable Plus. By April 1996, the network had reached 25% (or 22,700) of all cable television households in Metro Detroit and 80% (or 174,000 households) in other parts of its primary coverage area through expanded basic tiers.

=== Decline and shutdown ===
On October 31, 1995, Liberty Media, owner of the Prime Network and most of its affiliates, sold a 50% ownership interest in the group to News Corporation. That company would immediately assume operational control of Prime following the purchase's closure, with plans to launch its own slate of regional sports networks as an outgrowth of its fledgling Fox Sports division later announcing on July 3, 1996, that the Prime networks would be rebranded as Fox Sports Net beginning that November.

In 1997, Fox/Liberty Networks – a newly formed joint venture between News Corporation and Liberty – made a surprise bid for the local cable television rights to NHL games involving the Detroit Red Wings. News Corporation announced plans to launch its own regional sports network for Michigan to serve as a competitor to PASS. The new channel, later named Fox Sports Detroit (now FanDuel Sports Network Detroit), was originally targeted for a 1998 launch. As the respective broadcast rights to the Detroit Pistons and Detroit Tigers came up for renewal, Fox/Liberty made a joint bid with PASS for the contracts and was awarded the regional television rights to both teams on August 26, 1997.

Post-Newsweek concluded that its coverage area was not large enough to support two regional sports networks. As a result, on August 30, 1997, it chose to sell the remainder of the Tigers and Pistons contracts for the 1998 season and the contract of sportscaster John Keating to Fox Sports Detroit. Fox/Liberty Networks ultimately decided to accelerate the launch date of the new channel in time for the 1997–98 NHL season and 1998 Major League Baseball season, the respective seasons in which the Red Wings and Tigers contracts began. Post-Newsweek then announced that it would shut down PASS. The last program to air on the network was Trackside at Ladbroke DRC. The Pro-Am Sports System ceased operations at 12:00 a.m. on November 1, 1997, following a public service announcement for the National Ski Hall of Fame in Ishpeming, a slide of the PASS logo was shown for two hours after the network formally shut down. In addition to Keating (who still works for Fox Sports Detroit), several other announcers and hosts that have worked for PASS moved over to Fox Sports Detroit, remaining with the channel until its expected May 2026 closure as FanDuel Sports Network Detroit, or transitioning to the new Detroit SportsNet which is now carrying the Tigers and Red Wings.

== On-air staff ==
=== Former on-air staff ===
- Marty Adler – Live on PASS host
- Pat Caputo – Live on PASS host (1990–1992)
- Bill Freehan – Tigers analyst (1984–1985)
- Steve Garagiola – Live on PASS host (1993–1996)
- Ernie Harwell – Tigers play-by-play announcer (1994–1996)
- John Keating – Live on PASS host (1993–1996)
- Greg Kelser – Pistons analyst (1993–1996)
- Fred McLeod – Pistons play-by-play announcer (1984–1996)
- Chris McClure – CCHA Hockey analyst (1988–1996), Boxing play-by-play (1987-1994)
- Tim McCormick – Pistons and College Basketball analyst (1992–1996)
- Jim Northrup – Tigers analyst (1985–1994)
- Larry Osterman – Tigers and CCHA Hockey play-by-play announcer (1984–1992)
- Jim Price – Tigers analyst (1993–1996)
- Mickey Redmond – Red Wings analyst (1985–1996)
- Jack Riggs – horse racing play-by-play announcer and trackside host
- Dave Strader – Red Wings play-by-play announcer (1985-1996), CCHA play-by-play announcer (1985–1988)
- Kelly Tripucka – Pistons analyst (1993–1996)
- Eli Zaret – Tigers reporter
