= Jim Price (catcher) =

American baseball player and analyst (1941–2023)

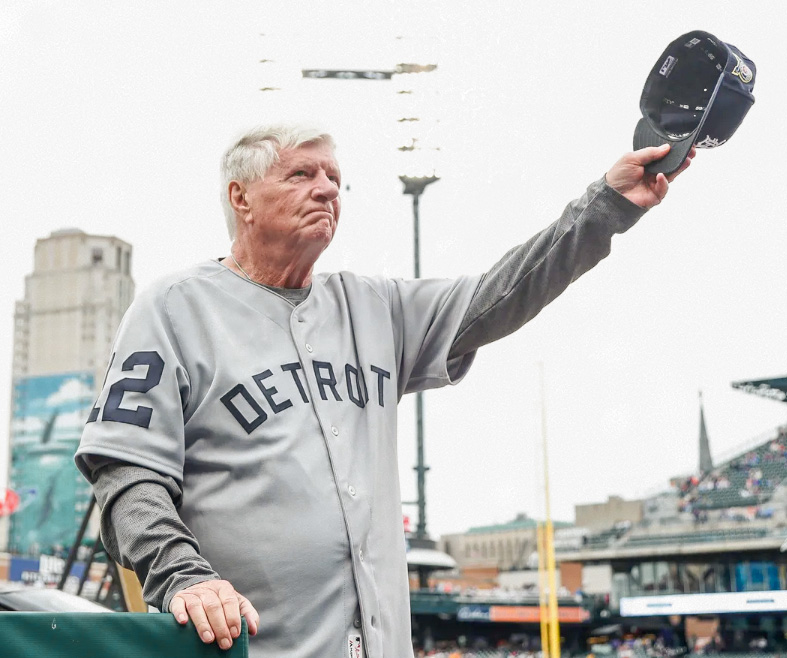
- Catcher
- Born: October 13, 1941; Harrisburg, Pennsylvania, U.S.
- Died: August 7, 2023 (aged 81); Washington Township, Michigan, U.S.
- Batted: Right Threw: Right

MLB debut
- April 11, 1967, for the Detroit Tigers

Last MLB appearance
- September 13, 1971, for the Detroit Tigers

MLB statistics
- Batting average: .214
- Home runs: 18
- Runs batted in: 71
- Stats at Baseball Reference

Teams
- Detroit Tigers (1967–1971)

Career highlights and awards
- World Series champion (1968)

Jimmie William Price (October 13, 1941 – August 7, 2023) was an American professional baseball catcher, who played in Major League Baseball (MLB) for the Detroit Tigers from 1967 to 1971. He was also the color commentator for the Detroit Tigers Radio Network and PASS for nearly 30 years.

== Baseball career ==
Price was born on October 13, 1941, in Harrisburg, Pennsylvania. He graduated from Hershey High School in Hershey, Pennsylvania, in 1960. He was a three-sport star at Hershey and Joe Paterno tried to recruit Price to play college football for the Penn State Nittany Lions.

After he graduated, Price signed with the Pittsburgh Pirates of Major League Baseball, receiving a $15,000 signing bonus. In 1963, he hit 19 home runs while batting .311 for the Kinston Eagles of the Single-A Carolina League. For his efforts, he was named the Pirates Minor League Player of the Year. He spent the 1965 and 1966 seasons with the Columbus Jets.

When the Pirates opted to send Price back to the minor leagues at the start of the 1967 season, he requested a trade. The Pirates sold Price to the Detroit Tigers for cash considerations. He made his MLB debut with the Tigers and he hit .261 in 44 games. Price played as the backup catcher to starter Bill Freehan. With the 1968 Tigers, Price won the World Series over the St. Louis Cardinals in seven games.

After the 1971 season, the Tigers demoted Price to the Toledo Mud Hens. Rather than report to Toledo, Price retired from baseball, and publicly called for MLB to reform the reserve clause.

== Softball career ==
Price played in the 1979 season for the Detroit Caesars in the American Professional Slo-Pitch League (APSPL), with the team finishing with a 40–24 (.625) record, losing in the playoff semi-finals to the eventual World Series champions Milwaukee Schlitz.

The Caesars played at Memorial Field in Eastpointe, Michigan, a small suburb of Detroit between 1977 and 1979, were owned by eventual Detroit Tigers owner Mike Ilitch, and featured several former Detroit Tigers such as Price, Jim Northrup, Mickey Stanley, and Norm Cash, largely in promotional roles. The Caesars disbanded at the end of the 1979 season.

== Broadcasting career ==
Price began his broadcasting career after retiring from baseball, working in local television in the Detroit area and for the fledgling ESPN, serving as an announcer for the first live sports broadcast on the network, the APSPL World Series for professional softball in 1979.

Price first worked as a color analyst on the Tigers' cable telecasts with PASS Sports in 1993, moving to the Detroit Tigers Radio Network in 1998. He worked alongside Hall of Fame broadcaster Ernie Harwell from 1999 to 2002. Price was later teamed with play-by-play announcer Dan Dickerson on the Tigers' radio broadcasts. As a former catcher, Price offered insight into baseball strategy, especially into pitching strategy including each pitcher's "arsenal". Since he handled pitchers in his major league career, Price informed fans about approaches to various hitters. He often referred to the Tigers as "we".

Price was absent for five games early in the 2012 season due to health trouble. According to Price, he had not previously missed an assignment in twenty years. In May, Price would miss a nine-game road trip, again for health reasons. He was replaced in both absences by former Tigers pitcher Dan Petry.

== Quirks and signature phrases ==
For several years, Price called play-by-play of the middle innings of each radio broadcast, and often announced "[player name]...touch 'em all" after a Tiger hit a home run. Another trademark of his was saying "nice area" whenever a city in Michigan is mentioned.

Price often spoke about "the art of pitching" when a Tiger pitcher was having a good game. After a particularly good curve ball was thrown, he would label it as a "yellowhammer", in reference to the bird who dives to the ground quickly. When a hitter connected solidly with the ball, Price frequently said that the batter put his "buggy whip" or "double buggy whip" on it, or that the ball was in his "buggy whip" area.

== Personal life ==
Price and his wife, Lisa, have a son, Jackson, who is autistic. They founded Jack's Place For Autism, a non-profit organization designed to assist families affected by the disability.

Price died on August 7, 2023, at home in Washington Township, Michigan. He was still working as a broadcaster for the Tigers up until a month before his death.
