= George Kell =

American baseball player (1922–2009)

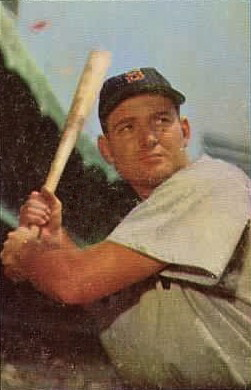
- Kell, c. 1953
- Third baseman
- Born: August 23, 1922; Swifton, Arkansas, U.S.
- Died: March 24, 2009 (aged 86); Swifton, Arkansas, U.S.
- Batted: Right Threw: Right

MLB debut
- September 28, 1943, for the Philadelphia Athletics

Last MLB appearance
- September 14, 1957, for the Baltimore Orioles

MLB statistics
- Batting average: .306
- Hits: 2,054
- Home runs: 78
- Runs batted in: 870
- Stats at Baseball Reference

Teams
- Philadelphia Athletics (1943–1946); Detroit Tigers (1946–1952); Boston Red Sox (1952–1954); Chicago White Sox (1954–1956); Baltimore Orioles (1956–1957)

Career highlights and awards
- 10× All-Star (1947–1954, 1956, 1957); AL batting champion (1949)

Member of the National

Baseball Hall of Fame
- Induction: 1983
- Election method: Veterans Committee

George Clyde Kell (August 23, 1922 – March 24, 2009) was an American professional baseball player and television sports commentator. He played in Major League Baseball as a third baseman from 1943 to 1957, most prominently as a member of the Detroit Tigers, where he became a perennial All-Star player and won the American League (AL) batting championship in 1949.

A ten-time All-Star player, Kell hit .300 or higher in nine seasons, producing a career batting average of .306 and led the league’s third basemen in fielding percentage seven times over a major league playing career that spanned 15 seasons. While lacking home run power, Kell was an outstanding contact hitter. He struck out only 287 times in 6,702 at-bats during his career, averaging just 26 strikeouts per 162 games.

Kell began his baseball career with the Philadelphia Athletics and later played for the Boston Red Sox, Detroit Tigers, Chicago White Sox and the Baltimore Orioles. After his playing career, Kell became a Detroit Tigers television play-by-play announcer for 37 years. He was inducted into the National Baseball Hall of Fame in 1983.

== Baseball career ==
In college, Kell played for Arkansas State, where the baseball facility, Tomlinson Stadium–Kell Field, is named after him.

Kell was a ten-time All-Star, batted over .300 nine times and topped the league's third basemen in assists and total chances four times and in fielding percentage seven times.

=== Athletics ===
Kell entered the leagues with the Philadelphia Athletics as a September call-up in the 1943 season. He appeared in one game on September 28, facing the St. Louis Browns as the starting third baseman and batted third.

The next year, he would play 139 games for the Athletics, and Kell batted .268 while having 138 hits while receiving a few votes for MVP. It was the first season that he would finish in the top ten in at-bats per strikeout, going 22.3 at-bats per strikeout to finish 8th in the American League. The following year, he would improve by batting .272 with 154 hits, including 30 doubles.

=== Tigers ===
In 1946, Kell played 26 games with the Athletics before being traded to Detroit on May 18 for Barney McCosky. In the American League, he ranked in the top ten for batting average with .322 for the year (fourth) and on-base percentage with .372 (9th) alongside hits (168, 8th). He also led the league in sacrifice hits with 15. On September 20 of that season, Kell went 6-for-7 with 4 runs and 3 RBI in a 15-1 rout of the Cleveland Indians. He played 131 games at third base and led the league in putouts, assists, fielding percentage and double plays.

He played 152 games in 1947 and hit .320 with 188 hits, garnering his first All-Star selection and finishing 5th in MVP voting. He was hampered by issues in the 1948 season, playing just 92 games while batting .304 with 112 hits, although he garnered MVP voting and an All-Star selection. He would bounce back in 1949 with his first and only batting title by batting .343, denying Ted Williams his third Triple Crown; until the final week of the season, Williams had led the batting race. On October 2, 1949, Kell went 2-for-3 while Williams was hitless in two official at bats. Kell's final mark was .3429, Williams' .3427. He had 179 hits while walking a career high 71 times (leading to a career-high .424 on-base percentage), and he struck out only 13 times all season.

George Kell was honored alongside the retired numbers of the Detroit Tigers in 2000.

One year later, Kell batted .340, leading the majors with 218 hits and 56 doubles, but lost the batting title to Williams' teammate, Red Sox second baseman Billy Goodman. However, he led the league in numerous hitting categories, played in 157 games and had a .982 fielding percentage, which was the third time he had topped .980. He scored 114 runs and had 101 RBI. Kell's 56 doubles were the most by a Tiger since Charlie Gehringer had 60 doubles in 1936 and remains the third-most by a Tiger player as of 2022.

He led the league in hits for a second and final time the next season (1951), having 191 in 147 games to go with 36 doubles while batting .319. It would be his last full year with the Tigers, as he was traded after 39 games in 1952 alongside Hoot Evers, Johnny Lipon and Dizzy Trout to the Boston Red Sox for Walt Dropo, Fred Hatfield, Don Lenhardt, Johnny Pesky and Bill Wight.

=== Red Sox, White Sox and Orioles ===
His tenure with Boston saw the team engage in attempts at stealing signs involving the scoreboard, and it wasn't long after his trade to Chicago (done on May 23, 1954, for Grady Hatton and cash) that management asked him about the system. He worked with teammate Bob Kennedy, general manager Frank Lane, and the ballpark crew on a system that used the scoreboard to flash a light (i.e. a one or a zero) for a certain type of pitch while Kennedy had binoculars to see signs.

Reportedly the scheme persisted long after Kell left the team in 1956 (the White Sox won the pennant three years later).

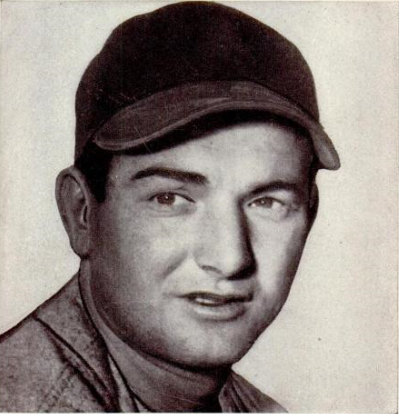
Kell in 1946

He spent the 1954 season playing mostly at third and first base with minimal time in the outfield. With 97 games, he batted .276. He continued this positioning for 1955, although he played 128 total games while batting .312 with 81 RBIs and 51 walks. He went through one more early season-trade with 1956, where he played 123 games while batting .271 with 115 hits with 33 walks and 37 strikeouts while being traded by the White Sox after 21 games on May 21, going with Mike Fornieles, Connie Johnson and Bob Nieman to the Baltimore Orioles for Dave Philley and Jim Wilson. He would spend time at third base while sharing time with second-year third baseman and fellow Arkansan Brooks Robinson (also a future Hall of Famer). He batted .271 for the year while having 115 hits and 48 RBIs with 37 strikeouts to 33 walks (marking the second and last time he had more strikeouts than walks, with the only other one being in 1944, his first full year). He made it to the All-Star Game that year, his ninth selection. 1956 was the tenth and final time that he ranked in the top ten for at-bats per strikeout, in which he went 11.5 at-bats between strikeouts.

He closed his career out in 1957, hitting .297 in 99 games while collecting his 2,000th hit during the year and making another All-Star Game while striking out 16 times with 25 walks.

In his career, Kell batted .306, with 78 home runs and 870 runs batted in, 881 runs scored, 2054 hits, 385 doubles, 50 triples, 51 stolen bases, a .414 slugging average, and 621 walks for a .367 on-base percentage. He posted a career .971 fielding percentage. Kell played 1,795 games, but he never played for a team that made the postseason or the World Series.

Kell was inducted into the Baseball Hall of Fame by the Veterans Committee in 1983. A quote from his induction speech at the Hall of Fame goes as follows, "I have suspected for a long time that George Kell has taken more from this great game than he would ever be able to put back. And now today I know that I am more deeply in debt than ever before."

== Broadcasting career ==
Following his retirement as a player, Kell entered into baseball broadcasting as a play-by-play announcer for CBS television (1958) and the Tigers (1959–1963, 1965–1996), also calling the 1959 National League tie-breaker series for ABC television with Bob DeLaney, the second 1962 All-Star Game for NBC radio with Jack Quinlan, the 1962 National League tie-breaker series for NBC television with Bob Wolff, the 1962 World Series for NBC radio with Joe Garagiola, and Games 3–5 of the 1968 World Series (for which the Tigers were the home team) for NBC television with Curt Gowdy.

Kell initially called Tigers games on both radio and television, sharing play-by-play duties with Van Patrick (in the 1959 season) and then with Ernie Harwell. Following the 1963 season he briefly retired from broadcasting, citing a desire to spend more time at his Arkansas home; after a one-year absence, Kell was persuaded to return in 1965 working the (less frequent) TV games exclusively while Harwell did radio. Kell's subsequent TV partners included Ray Lane, Larry Osterman, and (starting in 1975) fellow Hall of Famer and former Tiger Al Kaline as color commentator, the latter pairing lasting for the rest of Kell's broadcast career. He retired from the TV booth following the 1996 season.

== Personal life ==
Kell served for ten years on the Arkansas State Highway Commission (1973–83) and owned a car dealership, George Kell Motors, in Newport.

Kell's brother, Everett "Skeeter" Kell, played the 1952 season for the Philadelphia Athletics.

Kell and his wife Charlene were married for 50 years until her death from cancer in 1991.

Bestselling author Elmore Leonard, in the 1990 anthology Cult Baseball Players, wrote that Kell was his favorite player. When the novelist threw out the first pitch at a June 15, 1999, Tigers game at Tiger Stadium, Leonard wore a No. 21 jersey that was presented to him by the Tigers in an homage to Kell (who wore the number for four of his seven seasons).

== Death ==
Kell died at age 86 in his sleep in his hometown of Swifton, Arkansas, on March 24, 2009.

Fox Sports Detroit, by then the Tigers' local TV rights holder, honored Kell with re-airings of the special FSN Basement: All Star Edition 2005 featuring interviews with Kell and Al Kaline, each recalling his memories of playing for the Tigers and working together in the television booth. It re-aired several times during the week following his death.

== Highlights ==
- 10-time All-Star (1947–54, 1956–57)
- Eight consecutive .300 seasons (1946–53)
- AL batting champion, led the majors in batting average (1949)
- Holds record of the fewest strikeouts for a batting champion (13, in 1949)
- Twice led the league in hits and doubles (1950–51)
- Hit for the cycle (June 2, 1950)
- Had 6 hits in a game (September 20, 1946)
- Top 10 in AL MVP vote (1947, 1949, 1950)

== See also ==
- List of Major League Baseball players to hit for the cycle
- List of Major League Baseball batting champions
- List of Major League Baseball annual doubles leaders
- List of Major League Baseball career hits leaders
- List of Major League Baseball doubles records
- List of Major League Baseball single-game hits leaders

Achievements
Preceded by Stan Musial	Hitting for the cycle June 2, 1950	Succeeded by Ralph Kiner
