= John Keating (sportscaster) =

American sportscaster

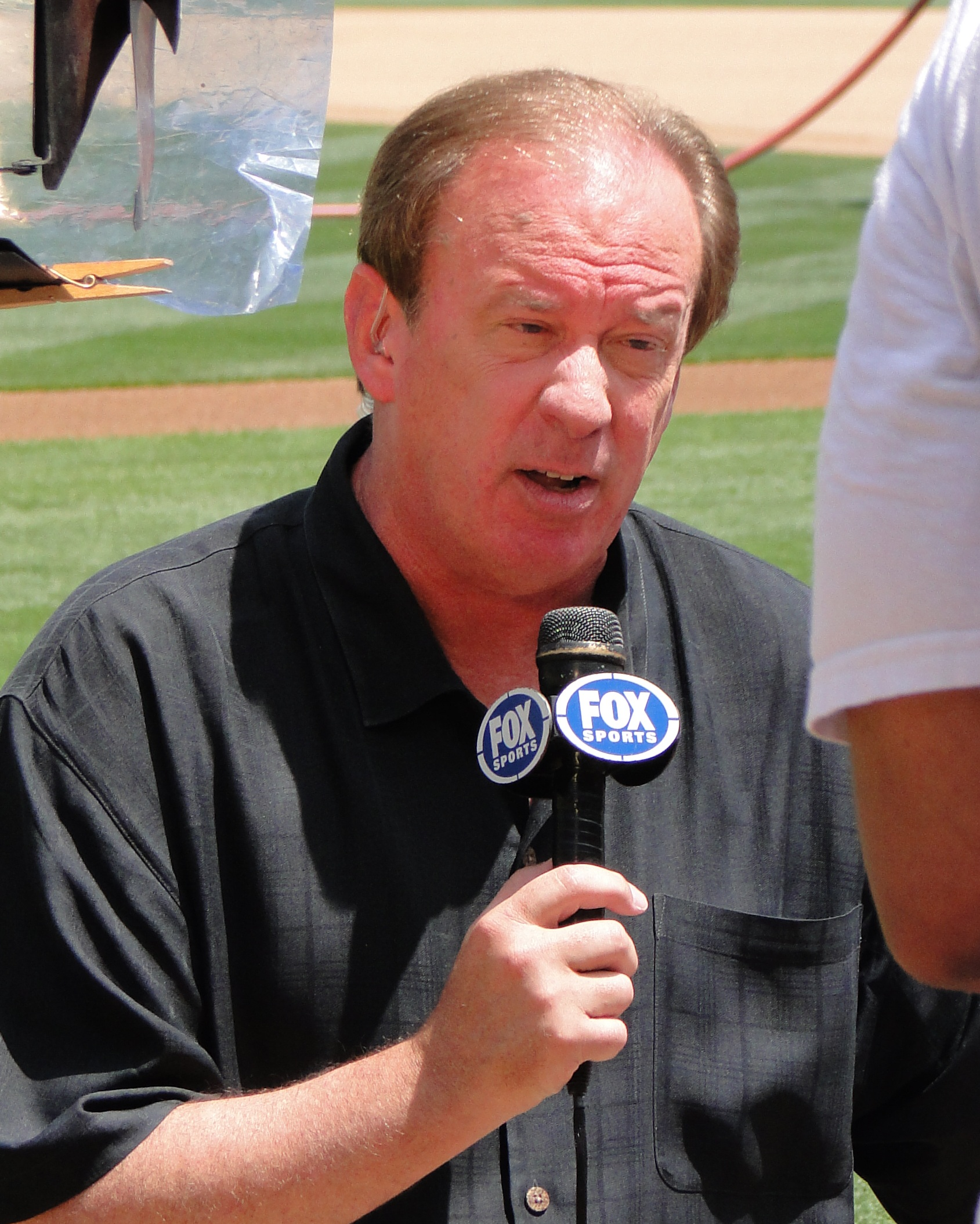
- Keating in 2011
- Born: 1956 or 1957 (age 68–69)
- Occupations: Sportscaster; reporter

John Keating (born 1956 or 1957) is an American former sportscaster.

== Early life ==
Keating grew up in Madison Heights, Michigan. He attended Grand Valley State University.

== Career ==
=== Radio career ===
Keating began his broadcasting career while a student at Grand Valley State University. Keating climbed through the ranks of WSRX, Grand Valley's own student run radio station, from broadcaster up to Station Manager. Keating's rise at WSRX led to a job at WZZR, now WLHT, a radio station in nearby Grand Rapids. WZZR already had an on-air personality named "John" on staff. To avoid confusion among listeners, Keating assumed the on-air name of "Steve Knight."

=== Television ===
The job at WZZR led to a job in television at WZZM-TV, also in Grand Rapids. At WZZM, "Steve" became an on-air fixture and sports favorite in west Michigan. Having transitioned to television, Keating was stuck being known on air as "Steve Knight". Keating left WZZM in the mid-80s for KMGH in Denver, Colorado, where he worked for a decade. Keating returned to Michigan and worked for the now defunct PASS Sports which was later put out of business by Fox Sports Detroit, who acquired his contract. Among his other roles, he hosts the pregame and postgame shows for the Detroit Tigers and Detroit Red Wings. In June 2009, Keating served as a temporary color analyst on the Detroit Tigers Radio Network for several road games, as regular analyst Jim Price substituted in turn for play-by-play announcer Dan Dickerson while the latter recuperated from leg surgery.

In 2019, Keating won his 16th local Emmy from the Michigan chapter of the National Academy of Television Arts and Sciences.

Keating retired on April 17, 2025, following the Red Wings' final game of the 2024–25 NHL season, ending his 45 year broadcasting career.
