= Jim Northrup (baseball) =

American baseball player (1939–2011)

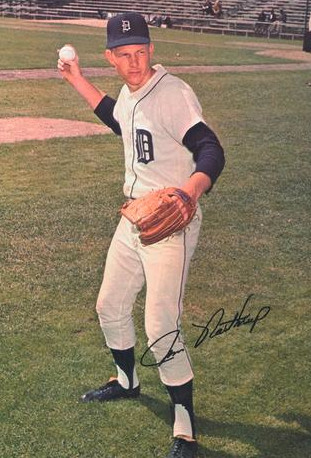
- Outfielder
- Born: November 24, 1939; Breckenridge, Michigan, U.S.
- Died: June 8, 2011 (aged 71); Holly, Michigan, U.S.
- Batted: Left Threw: Right

MLB debut
- September 30, 1964, for the Detroit Tigers

Last MLB appearance
- September 27, 1975, for the Baltimore Orioles

MLB statistics
- Batting average: .267
- Home runs: 153
- Runs batted in: 610
- Stats at Baseball Reference

Teams
- Detroit Tigers (1964–1974); Montreal Expos (1974); Baltimore Orioles (1974–1975)

Career highlights and awards
- World Series champion (1968)

James Thomas Northrup (November 24, 1939 – June 8, 2011), nicknamed "the Silver Fox" due to his prematurely graying hair, was an American Major League Baseball outfielder and left-handed batter who played for the Detroit Tigers (1964–74), Montreal Expos (1974) and Baltimore Orioles (1974–75).

== Career overview ==
Northrup was a good outfielder who played significant percentages of his time in all three outfield positions. Northrup's versatility allowed then-manager Mayo Smith to make him the Tigers' center fielder in the 1968 World Series, as Smith famously moved regular center fielder Mickey Stanley to shortstop to replace the weak-hitting Ray Oyler.

A streak hitter and catalyst for Detroit during the 1960s, Northrup was a power hitter who had good strike-zone judgment and a short, quick stroke. In the field, he had a decent arm, a quick release and good accuracy.

Northrup is best remembered for his contributions to the 1968 Detroit Tigers World Series Championship team. Northrup led the 1968 Tigers in hits and RBIs, hit five grand slams, broke up three no-hitters, and had the game-winning triple off Bob Gibson in Game 7 of the 1968 World Series.

In his 12-year major league career Northrup batted .267 (1254-for-4692), with 153 home runs, 610 RBIs, 603 runs, 218 doubles, 42 triples, 39 stolen bases and 449 bases on balls in 1392 games. Defensively, he recorded a .981 fielding percentage playing at all three outfield positions and first base. In 12 postseason games, he batted .286 (12-for-42) with 4 runs, 1 triple, 2 home runs, 9 RBI and 3 walks.

== Early years ==
Northrup was born in Breckenridge, Michigan, a small farm town 25 miles west of Saginaw. Northrup grew up on his grandfather's farm. Even after the family moved six miles away to St. Louis, Northrup spent his summers and weekends during the winter at his grandparents' farm.

Once a year, Northrup and his father would make a seven-hour drive (before the expressways) to Detroit when the Boston Red Sox came to town. Ted Williams was Northrup's idol, the "only idol I've ever had." Northrup, however, never saw a complete game as a boy. Rather than pay full price, his father would "wait until the sixth or seventh inning, because then you could give the guy outside a buck or two and you could go out there and watch Ted play."

After graduating from the St. Louis High School, Northrup stayed close to home for college, attending Alma College, five miles from St. Louis. At Alma, Northrup was a five-sport star. He was quarterback of the football team, and was named a small college All-American. He was a forward on the basketball team, ran track, and golfed, but Northrup's great love was baseball. "I was born to play baseball", said Northrup.

Northrup reportedly turned down offers from the Chicago Bears and the New York Titans and signed with the Tigers in 1961. Northrup spent four years in the minor leagues (1961–1964), playing for the Duluth–Superior Dukes, Decatur Commodores, Tennessee Smokies, and Syracuse Chiefs. He was the International League Rookie of the Year in 1964, as he hit .312 with 18 home runs and 92 RBIs.

== Detroit Tigers (1964–74) ==
=== 1964-67 ===
Northrup was called up to the Tigers during the last week of the 1964 season, getting one hit in 12 at-bats. In 1965, Northrup had a .205 batting average as he appeared in 54 games in the Detroit outfield, competing for playing time with Al Kaline, Don Demeter, Gates Brown, and fellow rookie Willie Horton. In 1966, Northrup won a spot as the Tigers starting right fielder, as Kaline moved to center field. Northrup finally showed his abilities as a batter, as he hit 24 doubles, 16 home runs, and ended the season with a .465 slugging percentage. In 1967, competition for a spot in the Detroit outfield intensified as Mickey Stanley proved to be an exceptional defensive player. Northrup played 143 games in the outfield, playing 65 games in left, 94 games in center, and 39 games in right.

=== 1968 ===
Northrup had his most satisfying season in 1968 as he played a key role in the Tigers' World Series Championship. Northrup played 151 games at all three spots in the Detroit outfield in 1968, including 103 games in right field, many in place of the injured Al Kaline. Northrup had a range factor of 2.17 – well above the league average of 1.80.

But Northrup's principal value was as a batter. In a year marked by dominant pitching throughout the league, Northrup hit 21 home runs and led the 1968 Tigers in hits (153) and RBIs (90). He was among the American League leaders with 90 RBIs (3rd in the AL), 57 extra base hits (4th in the AL), 259 total bases (5th in the AL), and 29 doubles (5th in the AL).

Northrup played in a rotation of four players at the three outfield positions, with Willie Horton, Mickey Stanley, and Al Kaline being the others. However, for the World Series, Detroit manager Mayo Smith decided to bring Stanley in from the outfield to play shortstop, giving the Tigers a firm outfield of Horton (left field), Northrup (center field), and Kaline (right field) in all seven of the games.

Northrup also hit five grand slams during the 1968 season, four in the regular season. The first came in May. Then, on June 24, 1968, Northrup hit grand slams on consecutive pitches in consecutive at bats in the 5th and 6th innings. This made him one of only 13 players (through July 28, 2009) to have hit 2 grand slams in one game, and the second to do so in consecutive at-bats (the first was Jim Gentile in 1961). Five days later, Northrup hit another grand slam, becoming the first major league player to hit three grand slams in a single week. Larry Parrish later accomplished the same feat in 1982, however, Northrup hit his three slams in only 14 plate appearances, setting a record that still stands as of 2021. Northrup's fifth grand slam came in Game 6 of the 1968 World Series, fueling a 13–1 blowout win for Detroit.

In addition to his grand slam in Game 6, Northrup had the key hit in Game 7 off St. Louis Cardinals ace Bob Gibson. After striking out 17 batters in Game 1, and pitching a complete game victory in Game 4, Gibson held the Tigers scoreless through the first six innings of Game 7. Northrup, who had a solo home run against Gibson in Game 4 to account for the Tigers only run off the ace thus far in the Series, came to bat with two men on and two outs in the 7th inning. Northrup hit a triple over center fielder Curt Flood's head, as Norm Cash and Willie Horton both scored. Bill Freehan followed with a double to score Northrup, and the Tigers won Game 7 to become World Series Champions.

Curt Flood, normally a superb defensive outfielder, was tagged a "goat" for having misplayed Northrup's Game 7 triple. But Northrup defended Flood: "He slipped a little, but it still went 40 feet over his head. . . . He never had a chance to catch it."

Northrup played all 7 games of the 1968 World Series, with a .536 slugging percentage, 8 RBIs, 7 hits, 4 runs scored, and 2 home runs. In a 2001 interview, Northrup concluded: "Winning the World Series had to be the highlight of my baseball career." Northrup placed 13th in the 1968 American League Most Valuable Player voting.

=== 1969–74 ===
Northrup had another solid season for the Tigers in 1969, as he raised his batting average to .295 (9th in the AL) and had career highs with 25 home runs and 31 doubles (6th in the AL). On August 28, 1969, Northrup became the first Tiger since Ty Cobb to hit 6-for-6, finishing the game with a 13th-inning game-winning home run over the Tiger Stadium roof.

In 1970, the Tigers dropped to 4th place in their last season under manager Mayo Smith. The Tigers were an aging squad when Billy Martin took over, and Martin sought to light a fire under them. Though Martin turned the Tigers back into contenders in 1971 and 1972, Northrup chafed at Martin's tactics. Northrup noted: "We got sick and tired of reading Martin say in the papers, 'I manage good, and they play bad.' 'I'd like to bunt, but my players can't do it.' . . . It was all, 'I, I, I,' and 'Me, me, me.' I did not respect him in any way . . ."

In the decisive 5th game of the 1972 American League Championship Series, the mutual dislike between Martin and Northrup may have affected Martin's judgment. In the 9th inning, the Tigers were trailing 2–1, and Norm Cash was on base. Northrup had one hit already off Vida Blue, but Martin used Mickey Stanley to pinch-hit for Northrup. Stanley hit into a fielder's choice, and the Tigers lost the ALCS. Northrup remained bitter about Martin's decision: "Who knows why Martin did what he did? I will say this: Billy Martin put most of us in a frame of mind where he took the fun out of the game."

In 1973, a 33-year-old Northrup hit .307 –- the highest batting average of his career. Despite his solid hitting, Martin kept Northup on the bench for part of the year. Northrup had played in at least 130 games for the Tigers for 7 straight years, but in 1973 he played in only 119 games. Martin was fired by the Tigers before the 1973 season was over, but Northrup's time with the Tigers was also nearing an end.

== Montreal Expos and Baltimore Orioles (1974–75) ==
In August 1974, the Tigers sold Northrup to the Montreal Expos. Northrup played in only 21 games for the Expos before being traded to the Baltimore Orioles in September. Northrup finished his career in 1975 hitting .274 in 84 games for the Orioles. Northrup retired after the 1975 season. He later noted: "I'd had enough. I'd been away from home too much, and I wasn't with my kids enough. So that was the end of it."

Northrup earned $76,000 a year with the Tigers in 1973. Northrup calculated that he earned $418,000 in his 12-year career in the major leagues.

== Life after the Major Leagues ==
After retiring from baseball, Northrup signed with the Detroit Caesars, a professional softball team, and played two seasons (1977–1978). The Caesars played in the American Professional Slow Pitch Softball League (APSPL), winning league titles in both seasons with Northrup. The team was owned by Mike Ilitch who would later become the owner of the Detroit Tigers. The Caesars had extensive talent from the amateur softball leagues and both Northrup and fellow former-Tiger Norm Cash played part-time and promotional roles.

From 1985 to 1994, Northrup was a color analyst for the Tigers on the PASS Sports cable television service. He was the CEO of Jim Northrup and Associates, a manufacturer's representative firm in Southfield, Michigan. He was inducted in the Michigan Sports Hall of Fame (2000), and also has been a supporter of many college activities.

== Death ==
Northrup died on June 8, 2011, from a seizure. Longtime friend Bill Wischman said Northrup had been recently admitted to an assisted living facility in Holly, Michigan, 20 miles from his home in Highland. Northrup had been in poor health for some time and had been at the home for about a month because of Alzheimer's disease. In addition to having Alzheimer's, Northrup also battled rheumatoid arthritis for many years, Wischman said. "As ill as he was, he never complained", the friend said. Northrup was survived by his wife Patty; children Kamil, Azaria, Jim, Paige and Kate; and seven grandchildren.

== See also ==
- 1968 Detroit Tigers season
- List of Major League Baseball single-game grand slam leaders
- Detroit Tigers/Broadcasters
- List of Major League Baseball single-game hits leaders
