= 1968 World Series =

65th edition of Major League Baseball's championship series

Team (Wins)	Managers	Season
Detroit Tigers (4)	Mayo Smith	103–59, .636, GA: 12
St. Louis Cardinals (3)	Red Schoendienst	97–65, .599, GA: 9
- Dates: October 2–10
- Venue(s): Busch Memorial Stadium (St. Louis); Tiger Stadium (Detroit)
- MVP: Mickey Lolich (Detroit)
- Umpires: Tom Gorman (NL), Jim Honochick (AL), Stan Landes (NL), Bill Kinnamon (AL), Doug Harvey (NL), Bill Haller (AL)
- Hall of Famers: Umpire: Doug Harvey; Tigers: Al Kaline; Eddie Mathews; Cardinals: Red Schoendienst‡ (manager); Lou Brock; Steve Carlton; Orlando Cepeda; Bob Gibson ‡ Elected as a player

Broadcast
- Television: NBC
- TV announcers: Curt Gowdy; Harry Caray (in St. Louis); George Kell (in Detroit)
- Radio: NBC
- Radio announcers: Pee Wee Reese; Ernie Harwell (in Detroit); Jack Buck (in St. Louis); Jim Simpson (Game 7)

The 1968 World Series was the championship series of Major League Baseball's (MLB) 1968 season. The 65th edition of the World Series, it was a best-of-seven playoff between the American League (AL) champion Detroit Tigers and the National League (NL) champion (and defending World Series champion) St. Louis Cardinals. The Tigers won in seven games for their first championship since 1945, and the third in their history.

The Tigers came back from a three-games-to-one deficit to win three consecutive games, largely on the arm of Mickey Lolich, who was named World Series Most Valuable Player (MVP); as of 2026, he remains the last pitcher to earn three complete-game victories in a single World Series. In his third appearance in the Series, Lolich had to pitch after only two days' rest in the deciding Game 7, because regular-season 31-game winner Denny McLain was moved up to Game 6 – also on two days' rest. In Game 5, the Tigers' hopes for the title would have been in jeopardy had Bill Freehan not tagged out Lou Brock in a home plate collision, on a perfect throw from left fielder Willie Horton, when Brock elected not to slide and went in standing up.

The 1968 season was tagged "The Year of the Pitcher", and the Series featured dominant performances from Cardinals pitcher Bob Gibson, MVP of the 1964 and 1967 World Series. Gibson came into the World Series with a regular-season earned run average (ERA) of just 1.12, a modern era record, and he pitched complete games in Games 1, 4, and 7. He was the winning pitcher in Games 1 and 4. In Game 1, he threw a shutout, striking out a Series record 17 batters, besting Sandy Koufax's 1963 record by two; it still stands as the World Series record today. In Game 4, a solo home run by Jim Northrup was the only offense the Tigers were able to muster, as Gibson struck out ten batters. In Game 7, Gibson was defeated by series MVP Lolich, allowing three runs on four straight hits in the seventh inning, although the key play was a Northrup triple that was seemingly misplayed by center fielder Curt Flood and could have been the third out with no runs scoring.

The World Series saw the Cardinals lose a Game 7 for the first time in their history. This was the sixth World Series of the 1960s to go to a full seven games, the most of any decade. The Tigers were the third team to come back from a three-games-to-one deficit to win a best-of-seven World Series, the first two being the 1925 Pirates and the 1958 Yankees; since then, the 1979 Pirates, the 1985 Royals, and the 2016 Cubs have also accomplished this feat.

Detroit manager Mayo Smith received some notoriety for moving outfielder Mickey Stanley to shortstop for the 1968 World Series, which has been called one of the gutsiest coaching moves in sports history by multiple sources. Stanley, who replaced the superior fielding but much weaker hitting Ray Oyler, would make two errors in the Series, neither of which led to a run.

This was also the final World Series played prior to MLB's 1969 expansion, which coincided with the introduction of divisional play, and the introduction of the Major League Baseball postseason playoff format which included only a League Championship Series at the time before being expanded in 1995, 2012, and 2022. Thus, it was the final World Series that guaranteed the teams with the best records from each league would be playing.

Tigers pitcher Mickey Lolich was named World Series MVP. Lolich compiled a 3-0 record (all three of his starts were complete games), with a 1.67 ERA and 21 strikeouts.

As of 2026, this is the last time that the Tigers clinched a World Series championship on the road.

== Summary ==
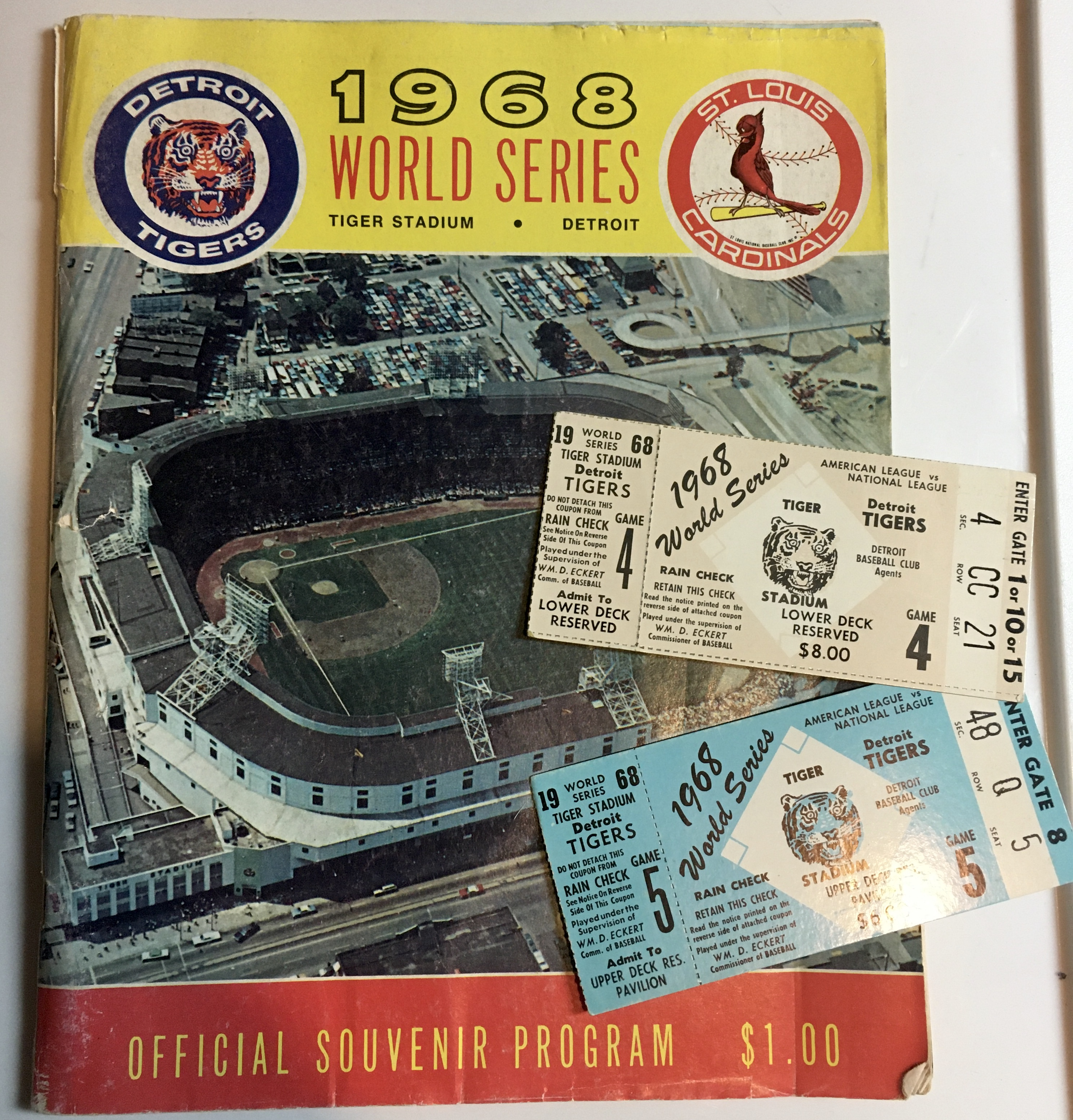
Program and tickets from Game 4 and 5, both played at Tiger Stadium

AL Detroit Tigers (4) vs. NL St. Louis Cardinals (3)

Game	Date	Score	Location	Time	Attendance
1	October 2	Detroit Tigers – 0, St. Louis Cardinals – 4	Busch Memorial Stadium	2:29	54,692
2	October 3	Detroit Tigers – 8, St. Louis Cardinals – 1	Busch Memorial Stadium	2:41	54,692
3	October 5	St. Louis Cardinals – 7, Detroit Tigers – 3	Tiger Stadium	3:17	53,634
4	October 6	St. Louis Cardinals – 10, Detroit Tigers – 1	Tiger Stadium	2:34	53,634
5	October 7	St. Louis Cardinals – 3, Detroit Tigers – 5	Tiger Stadium	2:43	53,634
6	October 9	Detroit Tigers – 13, St. Louis Cardinals – 1	Busch Memorial Stadium	2:26	54,692
7	October 10	Detroit Tigers – 4, St. Louis Cardinals – 1	Busch Memorial Stadium	2:07	54,692

== Matchups ==
=== Game 1 ===
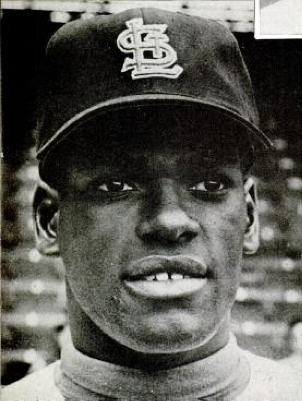
Bob Gibson

Wednesday, October 2, 1968 1:00 pm (CT) at Busch Memorial Stadium in St. Louis, Missouri
Team	1	2	3	4	5	6	7	8	9	R	H	E
Detroit	0	0	0	0	0	0	0	0	0	0	5	3
St. Louis	0	0	0	3	0	0	1	0	X	4	6	0
WP: Bob Gibson (1–0) LP: Denny McLain (0–1); Home runs: DET: None; STL: Lou Brock (1)

The Tigers roared into Game 1 by setting a then-team record with 103 victories on the season and were appearing in their first World Series in 23 years. The Tigers led the American League with 185 home runs, led by left fielder Willie Horton with 36 and first baseman Norm Cash and catcher Bill Freehan added 25 each. Their team batting average was .235, fourth best in the league; the team stole only 26 bases on the year, with Dick McAuliffe leading the team with only eight. The Cardinals, on the other hand, stole 110 bases (led by Hall of Famer Lou Brock with 68), led the NL with 48 triples, and had a team batting average of .249, but hit only 73 home runs and had only two players, Orlando Cepeda and Mike Shannon with double-digit totals. Pitching was about even as both teams set their rotations for Game 1 with solid starters and adequate relievers.

Fans overflowed Busch Stadium for Game 1 to watch the highly anticipated match-up of the Major League's top two pitchers—the Cardinals' Bob Gibson (22–9, 1.12 ERA) and the Tigers' Denny McLain (31–6, 1.96 ERA). Gibson was looking to become the first National League pitcher to win six World Series games while McLain was pitching in his first World Series game. The Cardinals had far more World Series experience than the Tigers with most of the Cardinal lineup (including all nine Game 1 starters) having played in a prior World Series. The Cardinals had won the World Series the year prior in 1967 and had also won in 1964. Both pitchers were highly competitive, fast workers, sporting overpowering fastballs coupled with excellent control.

Gibson's performance in Game 1 was phenomenal. The menacing right-handed pitcher shut out the Tigers on just five hits, and he struck out a World Series-record 17 Detroit Tigers batters.

The Cardinals broke through with three in the fourth off McLain. Known for superb control, McLain uncharacteristically walked Roger Maris and Tim McCarver in successive at-bats. Cardinal third baseman Mike Shannon singled in Maris and went to second base when Tiger left fielder Willie Horton misplayed the ball. McCarver pulled in at third. Cardinal second baseman Julián Javier followed this by singling in both baserunners to make the score 3–0. Outfielder Lou Brock added a home run in the seventh inning to complete the scoring.

Gibson finished the game in the ninth inning with his 15th, 16th, and 17th strikeouts to pass Sandy Koufax's previous record of 15, set in the 1963 World Series.

=== Game 2 ===
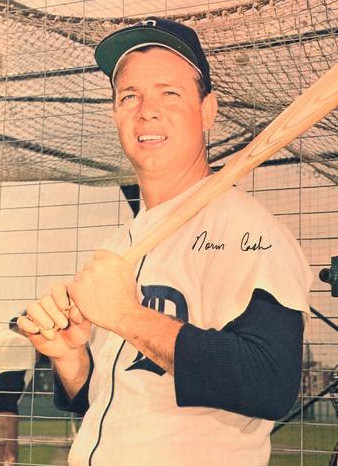
Norm Cash

Thursday, October 3, 1968 1:00 pm (CT) at Busch Memorial Stadium in St. Louis, Missouri
Team	1	2	3	4	5	6	7	8	9	R	H	E
Detroit	0	1	1	0	0	3	1	0	2	8	13	1
St. Louis	0	0	0	0	0	1	0	0	0	1	6	1
WP: Mickey Lolich (1–0) LP: Nelson Briles (0–1); Home runs: DET: Willie Horton (1), Mickey Lolich (1), Norm Cash (1); STL: None

The Tigers' starting pitcher Mickey Lolich earned a complete-game victory, striking out nine batters, and the Tigers tied the Series.

Tiger outfielder Willie Horton hit a home run in the second inning; Lolich also helped his own cause with a homer in the third inning off the Cardinals' starter, Nelson Briles, scoring the eventual game-winning run. This was the only home run that Lolich hit during his entire professional career. The Tigers broke the game open in the sixth inning when first baseman Norm Cash led off with another homer, and second baseman Dick McAuliffe later provided a two-run single.

Cardinal first baseman Orlando Cepeda gave St. Louis a run with an RBI single in the sixth, but that was all they scored. Al Kaline scored in the seventh inning when Jim Northrup hit into a double play, and the Tigers scored their final two runs in the ninth inning with bases-loaded walks to Don Wert and Lolich.

=== Game 3 ===
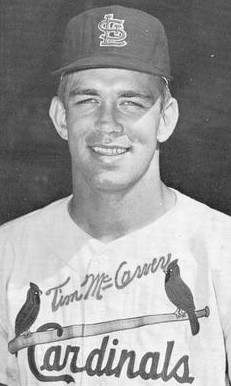
Tim McCarver

Saturday, October 5, 1968 1:00 pm (ET) at Tiger Stadium in Detroit, Michigan
Team	1	2	3	4	5	6	7	8	9	R	H	E
St. Louis	0	0	0	0	4	0	3	0	0	7	13	0
Detroit	0	0	2	0	1	0	0	0	0	3	4	0
WP: Ray Washburn (1–0) LP: Earl Wilson (0–1) Sv: Joe Hoerner (1); Home runs: STL: Tim McCarver (1), Orlando Cepeda (1); DET: Al Kaline (1), Dick McAuliffe (1)

In the first of three games at Detroit's Tiger Stadium, Al Kaline started the scoring with a two-run homer in the third inning, but the Cardinals came back in the fifth inning on an RBI double by center fielder Curt Flood off starter Earl Wilson. After Wilson put another batter on base, catcher Tim McCarver launched a three-run home run for the eventual game-winning runs off relief pitcher Pat Dobson. The Tigers cut the deficit to just one run on a home run by Dick McAuliffe. But Orlando Cepeda put the game out of reach in the seventh inning by smacking a three-run home run.

The Cardinals' reliever Joe Hoerner entered the game in the sixth in relief of Ray Washburn (who got the win) and earned a save with three scoreless innings pitched. Hoerner also collected a single batting in the eighth and became the first major leaguer to get a hit in the World Series after going hitless for the entire season.

=== Game 4 ===
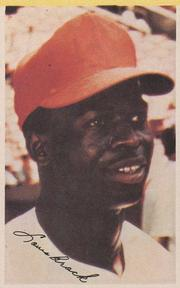
Lou Brock

Sunday, October 6, 1968 1:35 pm (ET) at Tiger Stadium in Detroit, Michigan
Team	1	2	3	4	5	6	7	8	9	R	H	E
St. Louis	2	0	2	2	0	0	0	4	0	10	13	0
Detroit	0	0	0	1	0	0	0	0	0	1	5	4
WP: Bob Gibson (2–0) LP: Denny McLain (0–2); Home runs: STL: Lou Brock (2), Bob Gibson (1); DET: Jim Northrup (1)

Tiger manager Mayo Smith, needing another left-handed bat in the lineup, made a major change by inserting veteran Eddie Mathews at third base. Mathews, recovering from a spinal operation that nearly ended his career, had one hit in the last game of his major league career. After a 35-minute rain delay, hard-hitting Hall-of-Famer Hank Greenberg threw out the first pitch.

McLain had trouble warming up amidst the rainfall, and was throwing with less velocity from the outset. A 31-game winner during the regular season, he struggled for the second time in this World Series, as this one-sided pitching match-up with Bob Gibson showed. Lou Brock led the game off with a home run, and Mike Shannon added an RBI single later in the first inning. Two more Cardinals runs were knocked in during the third inning on Tim McCarver's triple and Mike Shannon's double. McLain's troubles continued, and after a walk to Julián Javier, the umpires stopped the game due to rain with two out in the third inning. McLain did not return when play resumed after a one-hour and 15-minute rain delay. Bob Gibson did return after the delay, and helped his own cause by hitting a home run off Joe Sparma in the fourth inning. Next, Brock knocked a triple and scored on a ground-out by Roger Maris.

The Cardinals' final runs came in the eighth inning when Gibson walked with the bases loaded, forcing in one run, and then Lou Brock drove in three more runs with a double. Brock was just a single short of hitting for the cycle in this game.

The Tigers' only run came in the fourth inning when Jim Northrup hit a home run. Other than that, Gibson was a nearly perfect pitcher, tossing his second complete game in this World Series while striking out ten batters. The Cards now had a commanding 3–1 series lead.

=== Game 5 ===
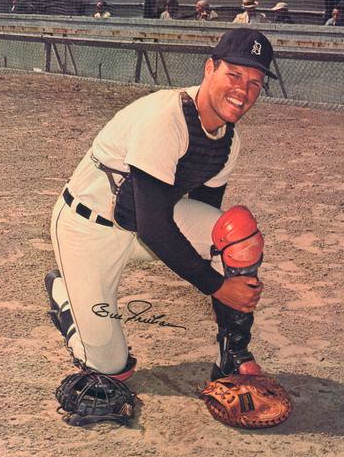
Bill Freehan

Monday, October 7, 1968 1:00 pm (ET) at Tiger Stadium in Detroit, Michigan
Team	1	2	3	4	5	6	7	8	9	R	H	E
St. Louis	3	0	0	0	0	0	0	0	0	3	9	0
Detroit	0	0	0	2	0	0	3	0	X	5	9	1
WP: Mickey Lolich (2–0) LP: Joe Hoerner (0–1); Home runs: STL: Orlando Cepeda (2); DET: None

With the World Series on the line, the Tigers used their winner of Game 2, Mickey Lolich, as their starting pitcher. Lolich's first inning in this game was not too promising, as he allowed an RBI single by Curt Flood and a two-run home run to Orlando Cepeda. However, Lolich soon settled down, striking out eight Cardinal batters and allowing no more runs.

Tigers' first baseman Norm Cash began the team comeback with a sacrifice fly in the fourth inning, plating Mickey Stanley who had tripled. This was followed by a Willie Horton triple and Jim Northrup's RBI single, making it a 3–2 game. In the fifth inning, the Cardinals had a chance to go up by two runs after Lou Brock hit a one-out double. Cardinal second baseman Julián Javier followed with a base hit to left. Outfielder Willie Horton fielded the ball off the ground and then fired the ball towards home plate. The throw was not cut off by Don Wert, and instead of sliding into home plate, Brock tried to bowl over Tiger catcher Bill Freehan. However, Freehan caught and held onto the ball while blocking the corner of the plate with his foot, and Brock was called out. This was the last time that the Cardinals threatened to score in the game.

The Cardinals' starting pitcher Nelson Briles was taken out of the game in the seventh inning with one runner on base, and was replaced by reliever Joe Hoerner. After Hoerner loaded the bases, the Tigers began a game-winning rally, with Al Kaline hitting a two-run single to give his team a 4–3 lead. Norm Cash then knocked in an insurance run with a single.

José Feliciano's unconventional pregame version of "The Star-Spangled Banner" aroused considerable controversy, with the Tigers and NBC getting thousands of angry letters and telephone calls about the performance. Lolich later blamed Feliciano's unusually long rendition for causing him to get cold after his warm-ups and thus give up three early runs.

=== Game 6 ===
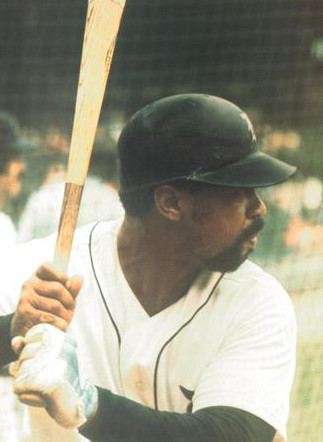
Willie Horton

Wednesday, October 9, 1968 1:00 pm (CT) at Busch Memorial Stadium in St. Louis, Missouri
Team	1	2	3	4	5	6	7	8	9	R	H	E
Detroit	0	2	10	0	1	0	0	0	0	13	12	1
St. Louis	0	0	0	0	0	0	0	0	1	1	9	1
WP: Denny McLain (1–2) LP: Ray Washburn (1–1); Home runs: DET: Jim Northrup (2), Al Kaline (2); STL: None

Now needing two wins in St. Louis to win the World Series, Tiger manager Mayo Smith chose Denny McLain again as his starting pitcher, even though he had only two days' rest and had not been very successful in his two prior Series starts. Cardinals' manager Red Schoendienst stayed with his normal three-starter rotation, selecting Ray Washburn, who had won Game 3. The choice of McLain paid off for the Tigers, as he pitched a complete game in a 13–1 rout of the Cardinals.

The Tigers went up 2–0 in the second inning on RBI hits by Willie Horton and Bill Freehan. In the third, the Tigers sent 15 batters to the plate and scored 10 runs off of three Cardinals pitchers. Jim Northrup's grand slam highlighted the inning. Al Kaline added a home run in the fifth inning. The Cardinals' lone run came off an RBI single by Julián Javier with two outs in the bottom of the ninth, but that was all they could do against McLain.

=== Game 7 ===
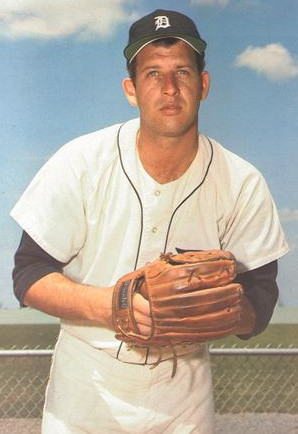
Mickey Lolich

Thursday, October 10, 1968 1:00 pm (CT) at Busch Memorial Stadium in St. Louis, Missouri
Team	1	2	3	4	5	6	7	8	9	R	H	E
Detroit	0	0	0	0	0	0	3	0	1	4	8	1
St. Louis	0	0	0	0	0	0	0	0	1	1	5	0
WP: Mickey Lolich (3–0) LP: Bob Gibson (2–1); Home runs: DET: None; STL: Mike Shannon (1)

In Game 7 (the final game of Roger Maris' career), Mickey Lolich and Bob Gibson, squared off in a classic duel. Like McLain in Game 6, Lolich was starting on only two days' rest.

Lolich and Gibson matched zeroes for six innings, but in the top of the seventh, Gibson surrendered two-out singles to Norm Cash and Willie Horton. Jim Northrup then hit a hard smash to deep center; Curt Flood, who won numerous Gold Glove awards in his career, misjudged it and briefly started in on the ball before turning around to go back. The ball one-hopped the warning track, two runs scored, Northrup wound up with a triple, and Lolich had all the runs he needed. Flood has been criticized by some who believe he would have caught the ball had his first steps been back instead of in. Jim Northrup said, "[Flood] slipped a little, but the ball was 40 feet over his head. He never had a chance to catch it." However, his teammate Denny McLain claimed in his 1975 book that "Flood blew it." Orlando Cepeda, in his 1998 autobiography Baby Bull, asserts that Flood would have caught the ball, had he not misjudged it. In the October 29, 1968, issue of The Sporting News, both Flood and manager Red Schoendienst indicated they would have expected the normally sure-handed outfielder to catch such a ball. By starting in, Flood had to both reverse direction and then regain his acceleration. He then slipped on the wet grass before recovering his speed, and by that time the ball was well beyond him. (Note: The misplay would have consequences beyond the field. After the season, Flood, who had long enjoyed a close personal friendship with Gussie Busch, chief executive officer of team owner Anheuser-Busch and president of the team, was upset when Busch offered him a smaller raise than Flood felt he deserved, given his stellar performance during that year's regular season; he believed that was punishment for the misplay that cost the team a chance to win a second straight Series. While he eventually did get the $90,000 salary he had wanted, he was also one of the players who led a boycott of spring training before the 1969 Major League Baseball season that forced the owners to expand their pension-fund contributions. After the boycott ended, Busch held a team meeting with the media present in which he angrily reminded players to stay focused on pleasing the fans; while Busch didn't mention any player specifically, Flood believed that the remarks were directed at him. At the end of that season, in which the Cardinals finished fourth in the newly created NL East division and thus did not return to the postseason, Flood was among several players traded to the Philadelphia Phillies. He learned of the trade not from Busch as he might have expected, but from a low-ranking team official. Instead of reporting to Philadelphia, he filed a lawsuit seeking to have the reserve clause in his (and every other baseball player's) contract invalidated as an antitrust violation, telling Howard Cosell that even though he was paid $90,000 a year, "a well-paid slave is still a slave." The U.S. Supreme Court ultimately held against him, and Flood's playing career effectively ended, but agitation for free agency continued; by the mid-1970s, players attained it.) Bill Freehan then doubled in Northrup, and in the top of the ninth, Don Wert added an RBI single.

The Cardinals got a run in the ninth on a Mike Shannon homer, but that was all as Lolich pitched his third complete game. The final out of the series was recorded when Bill Freehan caught a pop foul from the very next batter, Tim McCarver. Gibson struck out eight in the losing cause, giving him a record 35 strikeouts by one pitcher in a World Series, but Lolich was named as the World Series MVP. This is the last World Series game to date to feature complete games from both starting pitchers.

Cardinals shortstop Dal Maxvill went hitless in 22 World Series at-bats, a record.

As of 2026, this is the last time the Tigers played in and won a Game 7.

== Composite box ==
1968 World Series (4–3): Detroit Tigers (A.L.) over St. Louis Cardinals (N.L.)

Team	1	2	3	4	5	6	7	8	9	R	H	E
Detroit Tigers	0	3	13	3	2	3	7	0	3	34	56	11
St. Louis Cardinals	5	0	2	5	4	1	4	4	2	27	61	2
Total attendance: 379,670 Average attendance: 54,239; Winning player's share: $10,937 Losing player's share: $7,079

== Broadcast coverage ==
NBC televised the Series, with Curt Gowdy sharing the play-by-play commentary with Cardinals announcer Harry Caray (for the games in St. Louis) and Tigers announcer George Kell (for the games in Detroit). Tony Kubek served as field reporter and in-stands interviewer. Jim Simpson hosted pre-game coverage along with Sandy Koufax.

NBC Radio also broadcast the games, with Pee Wee Reese splitting play-by-play with Tigers announcer Ernie Harwell (for the games in St. Louis) and Cardinals announcer Jack Buck (for the games in Detroit). Jim Simpson came in to do play-by-play for the last two innings of Game 7 while Harwell went down to the Tigers’ clubhouse to cover the trophy presentation and conduct post-game interviews.

This World Series was the final NBC broadcast for Reese, who was dismissed by the network early in 1969 and replaced with Kubek as the lead color commentator alongside Gowdy on Game of the Week telecasts.

All seven games of NBC's TV coverage were preserved on black-and-white kinescopes by the Canadian Broadcasting Corporation, and circulate among collectors. Games 1 and 5 have been commercially released; these broadcasts, as well as that of Game 7, were frequently shown on CSN (Classic Sports Network) and ESPN Classic in the 1990s and 2000s.

== Quotes ==
He got him! Struck him out! A new World Series record of 17 strikeouts in one game.

— Harry Caray calling Bob Gibson's 17th strikeout in game 1 on NBC-TV

McCarver pops up. Here's Freehan. Detroit's the new world champion!

— Harry Caray calling the final out of game 7 on NBC-TV

== Aftermath ==
This was the last World Series played before the introduction of the Major League Baseball postseason playoff format the following year, where the American and National league pennants were decided in a five-game League Championship Series (later expanded to a seven-game series in 1985). The postseason would then be expanded to four teams per league in 1995 (the 1981 postseason was temporarily expanded to four teams per league due to a player’s strike), five teams per league in 2012, and then six teams per league in 2022.

The Tigers would return to the postseason in 1972, losing the ALCS to the eventual World Series champion Oakland Athletics in five games. This was the last championship won by a Detroit-based team until the Tigers won the 1984 World Series over the San Diego Padres in five games. During the 1970s, the City of Detroit experienced a rare and unusual slump for all four of its teams, as neither one would win a championship, let alone play in the championship round of the four major leagues. As of 2026, the Tigers’ 1968 World Series victory remains the last championship won by a Detroit-based team when all four teams played in Detroit city limits (the NBA’s Detroit Pistons won all three of their championships (1989, 1990, 2004) while they were playing in suburban Auburn Hills at The Palace of Auburn Hills and did not move back to Detroit proper until the opening of Little Caesars Arena in 2017, and the NFL’s Detroit Lions played in suburban Pontiac at the Silverdome from 1975 to 2001).

The Cardinals would return to the World Series in 1982, and defeated the Milwaukee Brewers in seven games for their ninth championship after being eleven outs away from elimination in Game 7.

== See also ==
- 1968 Japan Series
