= Pat Caputo =

American sportswriter and broadcaster (1959–2026)

- Born: 1959
- Died: May 7, 2026 (aged 67); Lake Orion, Michigan, U.S.
- Education: Michigan State University
- Presenting career
- Show: Pat Caputo
- Stations: WXYT-FM, Southfield, Michigan
- Time slot: Weeknights, Weekends
- Style: Sports radio
- Country: United States
- Website: www.audacy.com/971theticket/authors/pat-caputo

Pat Caputo (1959 – May 7, 2026) was an American sports writer and radio talk show host based in Southeast Michigan. He was an on-air host and sports columnist for WXYT-FM in Detroit. Caputo also occasionally appeared on the WJBK local sports discussion show SportsWorks.

== Early life ==
Caputo was born in 1959. He was raised in St. Clair Shores, Michigan, then moved to Birmingham, Michigan, at the age of 9. He attended Groves High School, where he played baseball and football, and graduated from Michigan State University.

== Career ==
Caputo was hired by The Oakland Press in May 1983, covering the Detroit Tigers from 1986 to 1998 and the Detroit Lions from 1998 to 2002, before working as the paper's sports columnist in 2002. His career at The Oakland Press would last until 2020 where Caputo was laid off, though he remained employed as a sports columnist for WXYT-FM.

=== Television ===
In 1986, Caputo became a regular contributor to the Tigers round table segment on WDIV. He hosted a segment on the Tigers pregame show from 1990 to 1992 on PASS Sports, known as Caputo's Corner.

=== Radio and podcast ===
Caputo began his radio career as a host at WDFN in 1996. In 2001, he would join their competitor WXYT as the host of The Book on Sports on weeknights and weekends. The station would later move to WXYT-FM in 2007, where the show's name was standardized as Pat Caputo. He was occasionally paired with Dennis Fithian, the co-host of Caputo and Fithian until Fithian was laid off in 2020. Since then, he continued to host Pat Caputo on weekends and weeknights.

He was also the host of the Detroit Tigers annual hot stove radio show TigerTalk with Dan Dickerson, Inside Hockeytown with Ken Kal, and Pistons Tonight. In 2022, he started a podcast called Bustin' Balls with Pat Caputo which goes over draft prospects for all four major sports leagues with regards to the local sports teams in Detroit.

=== Film ===
In 2011, he played a sportswriter in the film adaptation of Mitch Albom's Have a Little Faith.

== Personal life and death ==
Caputo was a resident of Lake Orion, Michigan.

On January 5, 2026, Caputo revealed that he had been diagnosed with stage 4 pancreatic cancer. He died of the disease on May 7, 2026, at the age of 67.

== Honors ==
Caputo was named the top sports columnist in Michigan by the Michigan Associated Press and the Michigan Press Association, and the top columnist in area by the Detroit Chapter of the Society of Professional Journalists. He was named among the Top Ten sports columnists in the nation by the Associated Press Sports Editors.
