= Frank Beckmann =

American broadcaster (1949–2022)

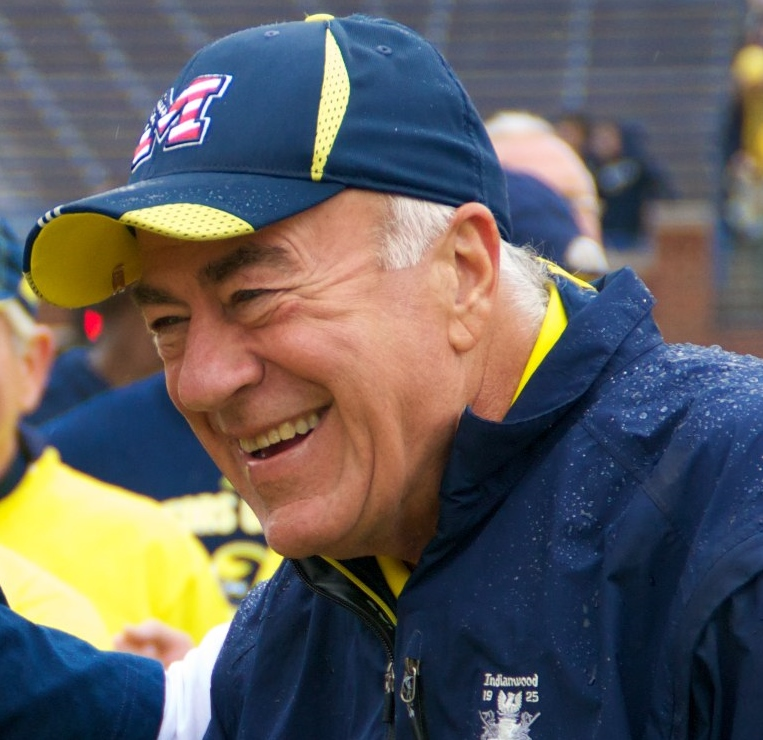
- Beckmann in 2012
- Born: Frank Carl Beckmann; November 3, 1949; Kiel, West Germany
- Died: February 12, 2022 (aged 72); Clarkston, Michigan, U.S.
- Education: Macomb Community College
- Occupation: Broadcaster
- Years active: 1969–2021
- Employer: WJR
- Spouse: Karen Beckmann (m. 1973)
- Children: 3

Frank Carl Beckmann (November 3, 1949 – February 12, 2022) was an American broadcaster and talk radio host on WJR in Detroit, Michigan. He also was the radio play-by-play announcer for University of Michigan football from 1981 to 2013.

== Early life ==
Frank Carl Beckmann was born in Kiel, West Germany, on November 3, 1949. His family immigrated to the United States when he was two years old and settled on the east side of Detroit. They relocated to nearby Warren during his sophomore year because Cousino High School had a radio station and offered courses in radio. He then studied broadcast journalism at Macomb Community College, where he graduated with an associate's degree.

== Career ==
Beckmann started his broadcasting career in 1969, working by himself as news staff in Alpena. He was then employed by WKNR in Dearborn and WDRQ in Detroit for a brief period, before becoming part of WJR in 1972. He was recognized with commendation for "Best Coverage of a Single News Event" while covering the disappearance of Jimmy Hoffa. He was subsequently chosen to be the primary substitute for J. P. McCarthy, the station's morning host.

Beckmann moved to the sports department of WJR by 1975, and eventually became its sports director. He became part of the radio team of the Detroit Lions in 1979, initially serving as an analyst for Bob Reynolds. He went on to succeed Reynolds as the team's play-by-play voice when the latter retired four years later. Beckmann also replaced Bob Ufer as the radio play-by-play announcer for University of Michigan football in 1981, when the latter stepped down for health reasons. Beckmann ultimately served in that capacity until 2013, and oversaw the team's national championship in 1997. He was also an announcer for the Detroit Tigers from 1995 to 2003.

Beckmann hosted Sportswrap, an all-sports talk show he created in 1981 that was one of the first of its kind. It ultimately ran for two decades. He also hosted The Frank Beckmann Show, a daily late-morning talk show on WJR in Detroit, from 2004 till he retired. Beckmann told his listeners on January 13, 2021, that he would retire on March 26.

== Political activism ==
In 2011, Beckmann considered a campaign for the United States Senate seat occupied by Debbie Stabenow, but said that the need to register as a Republican and to quit his broadcasting positions led him to decide against a candidacy.

== Personal life ==
Beckmann married his wife Karen in 1973, and they had two children.

Beckmann died in the evening on February 12, 2022, in hospice care at Clarkston, Michigan, at the age of 72. He had suffered multiple strokes and had vascular dementia prior to his death.

== Awards and honors ==
Beckmann was honored with "Top Michigan Sportscaster" awards by the Associated Press and United Press International and "Michigan Sportscaster of the Year" by the National Sportscasters and Sportswriters Association. He won the 2010 Detroit Sports Media Association Ty Tyson Award for Excellence in Sports Broadcasting and received the award in a special halftime press box ceremony at the University of Michigan football stadium. He was named a Lifetime Member of the Detroit Sports Media Association. Beckmann was inducted into the Michigan Sports Hall of Fame in 2008 for his accomplishments in sports broadcasting. Four years later, he was granted an honorary Doctor of Laws from Northwood University in May 2012.
