= Ray Lane (sportscaster) =

American sportscaster (1930–2025)

- Born: April 26, 1930; Detroit, Michigan, U.S.
- Died: September 27, 2025 (aged 95); Farmington Hills, Michigan, U.S.
- Education: Michigan State University
- Occupation: Sportscaster
- Years active: 1950s–1996
- Spouse: Carolyn Loose (died 2004)

Ray Lane (April 26, 1930 – September 27, 2025) was an American sportscaster from Detroit, Michigan. During the late 1940s, Ray played baseball and basketball for the Stags of Mackenzie High School. In 1949, he enrolled at Michigan State University and played baseball for the Spartans while earning a bachelor's degree in communications.

== Early life and broadcasting ==
Lane was born on April 26, 1930. From 1967 through 1972 Lane teamed with Ernie Harwell on Detroit Tigers radio broadcasts; he also worked on the team's television broadcasts from 1999 to 2003. Lane also broadcast at various times for the Detroit Lions, Detroit Pistons, Detroit Red Wings, University of Michigan and Michigan State football and University of Detroit basketball. Lane was also sports director at WJBK television (succeeding Van Patrick) and later at WKBD.

Outside of Michigan, Lane's other works included a stint with the Cincinnati Reds as well as Big Ten football and basketball.

== Fundraisers ==
Lane was a member of the Corporate Leadership Board of the Boys and Girls Clubs of Metro Detroit since 1972. He was also an active fundraiser for the United Foundation and the Sanctuary in Royal Oak, MI. Lane's daughter, Deanne Lane, is a former St. Louis television anchor. Deanne Lane died in January 2026.

== Personal life and death ==
Lane had three children – Greg, Deanne, and Jeff – as well as four grandchildren and six great-grandchildren. Lane died from complications of a fall at his home on September 27, 2025, at the age of 95.

== Honors ==
Lane was a member of Lambda Chi Alpha fraternity, was named Michigan Sportscaster of the Year by the National Sportscasters and Sportswriters Association in 1969 and 1980, inducted into the Michigan Sports Hall of Fame in 1997, and was a past president and lifetime member of the Detroit Sports Media Association, which presented him with the Ty Tyson Award for Excellence in Sports Broadcasting in 2003 and the Ernie Harwell Lifetime Contribution Award in 2014. Lane was also involved with the Michigan PGA Hall of Fame.

Michigan governor Jennifer Granholm declared October 3, 2009, as Ray Lane Day throughout the state.
