= Fred McLeod (sportscaster) =

American sportscaster (1952–2019)

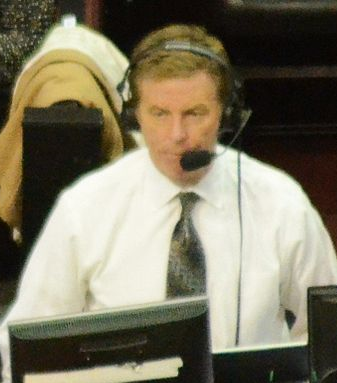
- McLeod in 2012
- Born: September 1, 1952; Strongsville, Ohio, U.S.
- Died: September 9, 2019 (aged 67); Ohio, U.S.
- Education: Point Park University
- Occupations: Sportscaster; NBA play-by-play announcer

Fred D. McLeod III (September 1, 1952 – September 9, 2019) was an American sportscaster who served as the executive producer of multimedia, and television play-by-play announcer for the Cleveland Cavaliers of the National Basketball Association (NBA).

== Early life ==
McLeod was born on September 1, 1952 and grew up in the Cleveland suburb of Strongsville. During his sophomore year in high school, McLeod and his family moved to the Pittsburgh, Pennsylvania, area, where he finished high school and attended college, graduating from Point Park College where he was a pitcher on the baseball team, reaching the NAIA College World Series.

== Broadcasting career ==
McLeod began his broadcasting career in 1974 as a sportscaster for KQTV in St. Joseph, Missouri, and later moved to WSTV in Steubenville, Ohio.

In the late 1970s, he returned to Cleveland when he was hired by WJKW-TV 8 as a weekend sports presenter, and also providing play-by-play commentary for WJKW's coverage of Cleveland Indians' games during the 1979 season. McLeod later moved to KPIX-TV in San Francisco, where he was a sports presenter as well as play-by-play commentator for the Oakland Athletics.

In 1982, McLeod moved to Detroit, Michigan, where he became a sportscaster for WJBK and later with WDIV, and in 1984 became a television play-by-play announcer for the NBA's Detroit Pistons, a position he held until 2006.

From the 2006–07 to 2018–19 seasons, McLeod was the television play-by-play announcer for the Cleveland Cavaliers alongside former Cavalier Austin Carr. He also served as play-by-play announcer for Detroit Lions preseason telecasts in 2019.

On September 9, 2019, McLeod died suddenly at the age of 67.

=== Signature calls ===
- Right down Euclid! - when a Cavaliers player drives down the lane to the basket
- ____ says "I got your back!" - when a Cavaliers player grabs an offensive rebound and puts the ball in the hoop
- Sweaty palms time - during the closing minutes of tight games
- The bottom! - when a Cavaliers player hits a three-pointer
- Shakin' the lake! - after a powerful slam dunk by LeBron James
- A wine and gold winner - immediately after the final horn of a Cavaliers win
- Good night ____, we'll let ourselves out! - when the Cavaliers win a road game
- He shut off his water! - when a Cavaliers player stops an opponent from driving to the basket
- He blew a tire - when a player on either side fumbles the ball and turns it over
- He's gone video game - when a player is hot shooting or hitting multiple difficult shots
- Convenient banking hours - when a player shoots the ball off the backboard and into the hoop. The phrase is often used sarcastically as if the player meant to bounce the ball off the glass all along when it clearly was a mere happenstance.
- He shuffled his shoes! - when an opposing player committed a traveling violation

== Awards and honors ==
- Four-time Lower Great Lakes Emmy Award recipient as a member of Fox Sports Ohio's Cavaliers broadcast team - 2014, 2017, 2018, 2019
- Rocket Mortgage FieldHouse media area named the "Fred McLeod TV Studio and Media Workroom"
