= Paul Carey (broadcaster) =

American sportscaster (1928–2016)

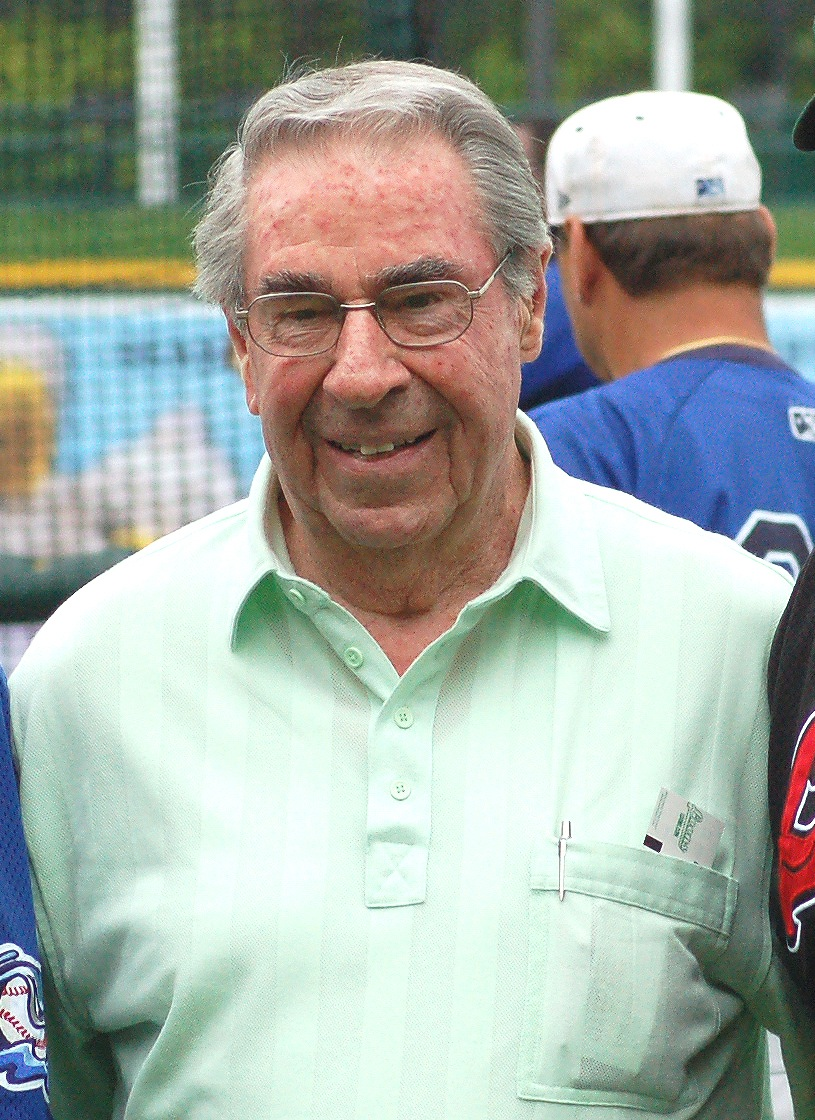
- Carey in 2007
- Born: March 15, 1928; Mount Pleasant, Michigan, U.S.
- Died: April 12, 2016 (aged 88); Rochester, Michigan, U.S.
- Education: Michigan State University
- Occupation: Sportscaster

Paul Carey (March 15, 1928 – April 12, 2016) was an American broadcaster and sportscaster who broadcast professionally in six different decades. He is a member of the Michigan Sports Hall of Fame.

== Early life ==
Carey was born in Mount Pleasant, Michigan, on March 15, 1928. His parents were Joseph P. Carey, a geography professor at Central Michigan University, and Ida B. Carey. He graduated from Mount Pleasant High School in 1946, attended Central Michigan from 1946 to 1948 and then Michigan State University from 1948 to 1950, graduating with a B.A. in speech, Radio and Dramatics.

His broadcast career was interrupted in 1950 with the outbreak of the Korean War. Carey was drafted in October 1950 and served in the Fourth Infantry Division, the first NATO division. He was a squad leader staff sergeant in a weapons platoon.

== Broadcasting career ==
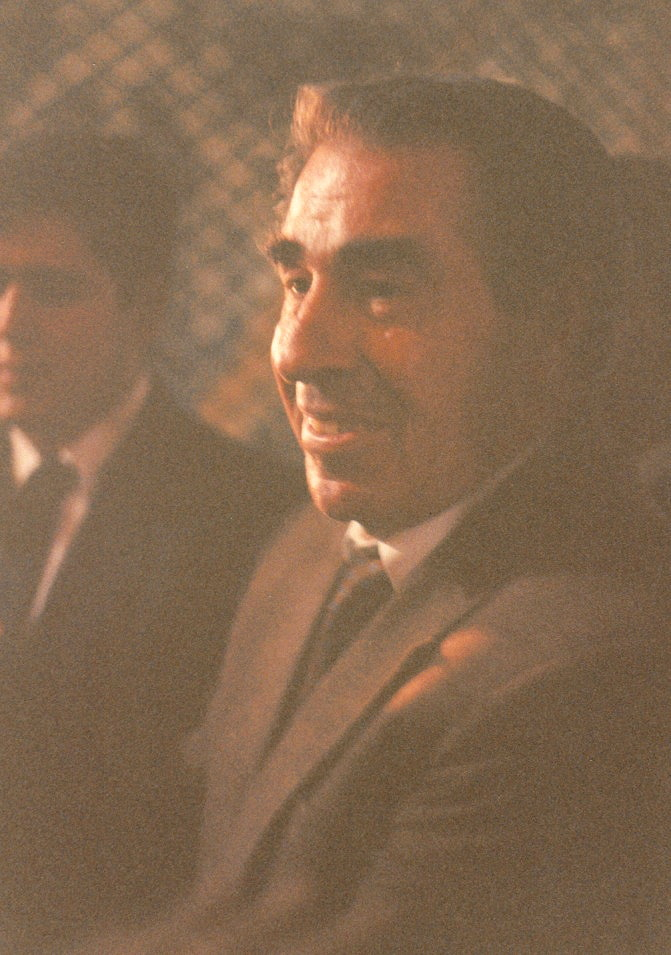
Carey after his last game called in Tiger Stadium, 1991

Carey was on the original announcing staff of WCEN in Mt. Pleasant when it went on the air on August 8, 1949. Later that year, he was part of the first broadcast ever made of a Central Michigan University football game. After completing his education and Army stint, he resumed his announcing and sportscasting duties at WCEN in October 1952. In April 1953, Carey moved to WKNX in Saginaw, Michigan, to become the afternoon disc-jockey. He also worked on WKNX-TV and did the first on-camera commercial for that station. During his stay at WKNX, Carey was program director of radio for two years. In June 1956, Carey joined the announcing staff at WJR in Detroit, Michigan, and worked there until his retirement in January 1992. He was a staff announcer from 1956 to 1965, and became Assistant Sports Director in 1958. During his tenure, he did pre- and post-game shows for Detroit Lions radio broadcasts; served as a play-by-play announcer for Detroit Pistons basketball for six seasons (1969-70 through 1972–73, 1975–76, and 1981–82); and originated and hosted a Michigan High School football and basketball scoreboard program. He was a member of the Associated Press All-State and ratings panel for 20 years. WJR was the flagship station for the Detroit Tigers Radio Network, and Carey produced the broadcasts for the network from 1964 to 1971.

When Ray Lane moved to television broadcasting, Carey joined Ernie Harwell as a play-by-play announcer for the 1973 season, a position he would maintain for 19 seasons. Except for the last three seasons, he handled engineering duties for the broadcasts as well. In December 1990, Harwell held a press conference to announce that WJR and the Tigers had forced him out of his position, and that the 1991 season would be his last. At the same press conference, Carey announced - in an unrelated decision made several months earlier - that he would retire at the end of the season. His last Tigers broadcast was on the final day of the 1991 season, the final baseball game at Memorial Stadium in Baltimore.

In 2012, Carey was named the third recipient of the Detroit Sports Broadcaster's Association (DSBA)'s Harwell Lifetime Contribution Award, after Harwell (the Hall of Fame announcer who came to the team in 1960 and announced Tigers' games for 42 seasons) and John Fountain. The award honors an individual from the broadcast industry who has contributed outstanding time and effort to the betterment of sports broadcasting through a lifetime body of work.

== Death ==
Carey died on April 12, 2016, in Rochester, Michigan, from chronic obstructive pulmonary disease (COPD), at the age of 88.

== Awards ==
- Elected to the Michigan Sports Hall of Fame, 1992
- Distinguished Service Award, Michigan High School Coaches Association
- Centennial Award, Central Michigan University, 1993
- Unsung Heroes of Sport Award, 1992
- Big Ed Award, Detroit Chapter of Baseball Writers Association, 1986
- Lowell Thomas Award, Capital Cities Communications, 1985
- Michigan Sportscaster of the Year 6 times, 1970-71-72-76-85-89.
- Detroit Catholic League Hall of Fame, 1995
- Basketball Coaches Assn. of Michigan Hall of Honor, 1997
- Honorary Lifetime Member of Detroit Sports Broadcasters Association (DSBA)
- Honorary Member of Detroit Tigers Alumni Association
- Dick Schaap Memorial Award
- Doc Fenkell Excellence in Media Award
- Ernie Harwell DSBA Lifetime Contribution Award

== Notes and references ==
- "Strictly Professional/Ernie and Paul"- Detroit Free Press, September 19, 1984
- "Ernie and Paul Together..." Detroit Free Press, April 5, 1987
- "Harwell's Streak Ends", Detroit Free Press, April 25, 1989
- "The Tigers' Utility Voice", Detroit Free Press, June 24, 1990
- "Carey Leaving on Own", Detroit Free Press, December 20, 1990
- "Toronto Sends its Love..." Detroit Free Press, August 9, 1991
- "Tigers, WJR to Honor Ernie & Paul" Detroit Free Press, September 4, 1991
