= Dan Dickerson =

American sportscaster (born 1958)

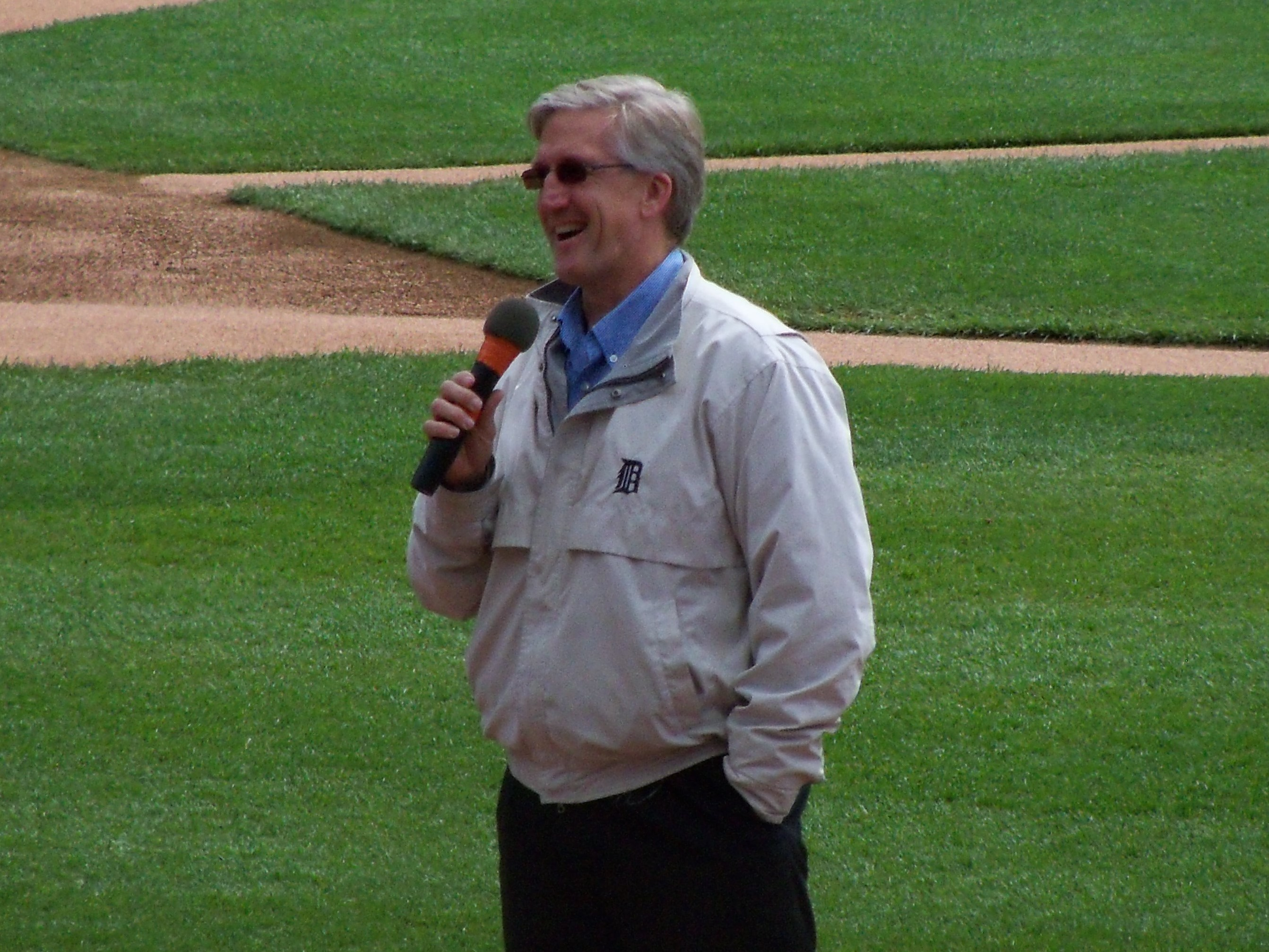
- Dickerson at Comerica Park in 2011
- Born: Daniel Hill Dickerson; November 13, 1958 (age 67)
- Education: Ohio Wesleyan University (B.A.)
- Sports commentary career
- Team: Detroit Tigers (2000–present)
- Genre: Play-by-play
- Sport: Major League Baseball

Daniel Hill Dickerson (born November 13, 1958) is an American sportscaster, best known for his current position as the lead radio play-by-play voice of Major League Baseball's Detroit Tigers on the Detroit Tigers Radio Network.

== Early life and education ==
Dickerson grew up in Birmingham, Michigan, the son of James Preston Dickerson and Rosemary Dickerson (née Wilcox). James was a political science professor at Oakland Community College whom Ronald Reagan appointed in 1981 as the special assistant to the Deputy Assistant Secretary of Defense. Dickerson attended the Cranbrook School in Bloomfield Hills before graduating from Ohio Wesleyan University with a Bachelor of Arts degree in 1980.

== Career ==
=== Early roles ===
He began his radio career at WMAX in Grand Rapids, Michigan, as a news anchor and reporter. He also covered high school football and basketball. He moved to competitor WCUZ in 1982, where he would cover sports for the next six years. Dickerson moved to Detroit in 1988 and WWJ, where he served as a general assignment news reporter and weekend news and sports anchor. He also hosted the post-game call-in show for the station's Detroit Lions broadcasts.

In 1995, Dickerson moved to crosstown competitor WJR, where he held a variety of positions. He served as co-host of the weeknight sports call-in show Sportswrap; morning sports anchor; sideline reporter and fill-in play-by-play announcer for Michigan Wolverines football; and play-by-play announcer for Michigan basketball for two seasons.

=== Detroit Tigers ===
While visiting with Hall of Fame Tigers announcer Ernie Harwell in the WJR booth during the final game at Tiger Stadium in 1999, Dickerson was invited by Harwell to call an inning of play-by-play. The following season, he joined the Tigers' radio broadcast team full-time, calling the middle innings of each game while Harwell handled the rest. Along with former Tigers catcher and color analyst Jim Price, this crew remained intact for three full seasons, even as the team switched radio flagship stations (from WJR to WXYT) at the end of the 2000 season. Dickerson took over as lead play-by-play announcer on Tigers radio following Harwell's retirement at the end of the 2002 season, working with Price as a two-man crew.

During the Tigers' 2016 season, Dickerson moved to the television booth to call several road series for Fox Sports Detroit while regular TV announcer Mario Impemba joined Jim Price in the radio booth, an experiment that was discarded the following season. As of 2024, he calls select telecasts for FanDuel Sports Network Detroit whenever primary TV announcer Jason Benetti is doing national work, with Erie SeaWolves broadcaster Greg Gania filling in for him on the radio.

On October 10, 2025, the Tigers were eliminated from the postseason in a 15-inning, game five loss to the Seattle Mariners in the American League Division Series. The Detroit Tigers Radio Network went to commercial with Dickerson's mic still on. "I don't have to do a game [recap]...ah, fuck," a frustrated Dickerson said. "Fuck this game recap. Oh, I'm sorry, was that out loud?" Dickerson issued an apology for his language while fans on social media, who shared his disappointment, were largely supportive.

Dickerson is a longtime member of the Detroit Sports Media Association, founded in 1948 by pioneering Tigers announcer Ty Tyson, and was presented with their Tyson Award for Excellence in Sports Broadcasting in 2009 and their Ernie Harwell Lifetime Achievement Award in 2016. He has also been named as Michigan Sportscaster of the Year four times (2005, 2006, 2014, 2022) by the National Sports Media Association.

Dickerson also hosts a hot stove podcast with Pat Caputo called TigerTalk during the winter months, available on the Tigers' website and iTunes, as well as the interview-style podcast Have a Seat alongside Jason Benetti.

== Broadcasting style ==
In a 2006 interview, Dickerson described his broadcasting style:

I really took my cues from Ernie Harwell. Growing up listening to him, I always felt he gave the other team a good call on a home run and, I'd say, better calls for the Tigers. But I like the way he just called the game. It was never moaned or complained... Everybody knows you're pulling for the Tigers and you're going to get more excited for the Tigers, but give a good call for both teams.

Dickerson's typical home run call is "Way—back—and—gone!" For long home runs hit by Tigers, he often uses an exuberant "Watch it fly!" For strikeouts, Dickerson's typical call is "Swing and a miss—he got 'im on strikes!"

== Memorable calls ==
On October 14, 2006, when Magglio Ordóñez hit a walk-off home run in Game 4 of the ALCS, making the Tigers the American League champions for the first time since 1984:

Swing and a fly ball, left field, it's deep, it's way back... the Tigers are going to the World Series! Three-run, walkoff home run! Ohhh man! Ordóñez around third, he's into the mob scene at home! The Tigers have beaten the A's 6-3, completing a four-game sweep in one of the greatest turn-arounds in baseball history! The Tigers, three years after losing 119 games, are going to the World Series! Magglio Ordóñez with his second home run of the game. What a sight at home plate!

On June 12, 2007, when Tigers pitcher Justin Verlander threw the sixth no-hitter in franchise history against the Milwaukee Brewers:

The 0–2 pitch—swing and a high fly ball to right—Ordonez going back—he's got room—HE MAKES THE CATCH! Justin Verlander has just thrown the sixth no-hitter in the 107-year history of the Detroit Tigers!

On October 18, 2012, when Yankees infielder Jayson Nix popped out to Tigers first baseman Prince Fielder in game 4 of the ALCS, making the Tigers the 2012 American League champions:

Coke is ready. The 1–1 to Nix—he swings and he pops it up on the right side! Fielder calling for it and he MAKES THE CATCH—WORLD SERIES BOUND! The Tigers sweep the Yankees with an 8–1 win!

On August 22, 2021, when Tigers designated hitter Miguel Cabrera hit his 500th career home run:

Fly ball, right-center, deep, got a chance—FIVE HUNDRED! Miguel Cabrera has done it! The high-five to Santiago as he rounds third and his teammates pour out of the dugout! And this crowd in Toronto on their feet!

== Personal life ==
Dickerson lives in Clarkston, Michigan, with his wife Lori Anne, a journalism professor at Michigan State University. They have two children, Rachel and Justin.

Dickerson tripped on a curb while jogging outside the Detroit Tigers team hotel in Kansas City, Missouri on May 26, 2009, forcing him to return to Michigan for surgery and miss six games. John Keating filled in for the remainder of the Kansas City series, and Al Kaline substituted for the Baltimore series. Dickerson returned to work on June 2.
