= Bill Freehan =

American baseball player and coach (1941–2021)

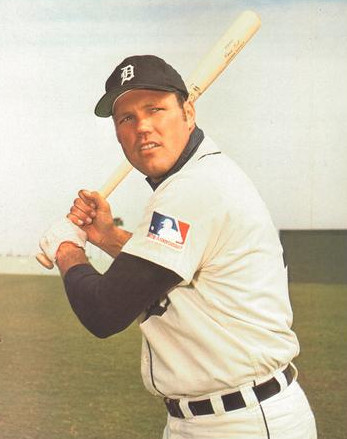
- Freehan c. 1969
- Catcher
- Born: November 29, 1941; Detroit, Michigan, U.S.
- Died: August 19, 2021 (aged 79); Walloon Lake, Michigan, U.S.
- Batted: Right Threw: Right

MLB debut
- September 26, 1961, for the Detroit Tigers

Last MLB appearance
- October 3, 1976, for the Detroit Tigers

MLB statistics
- Batting average: .262
- Home runs: 200
- Runs batted in: 758
- Stats at Baseball Reference

Teams
- Detroit Tigers (1961, 1963–1976)

Career highlights and awards
- 11× All-Star (1964–1973, 1975); World Series champion (1968); 5× Gold Glove Award (1965–1969)

William Ashley Freehan (November 29, 1941 – August 19, 2021) was an American catcher in Major League Baseball who played his entire 15-year career with the Detroit Tigers. The premier catcher in the American League for several years from the 1960s into the early 1970s, he was named an All-Star in 11 seasons, the most All-Star seasons for a player to not be inducted into the Baseball Hall of Fame. He was the MVP runner-up for Tigers' 1968 World Series winning team, handling a pitching staff which included World Series MVP Mickey Lolich and regular season MVP Denny McLain, who that year became the first 30-game winner in the majors since 1934.

A five-time Gold Glove Award winner, Freehan held the major league record for highest career fielding percentage (.9933) until 2002, and also the records for career putouts (9,941) and total chances (10,734) from 1975 until the late 1980s; he ranked ninth in major league history in games caught (1,581) at the end of his career. His career totals of 200 home runs and 2,502 total bases placed him behind only Yogi Berra and Bill Dickey among AL catchers when he retired.

== Early life ==
Freehan was born in Detroit on November 29, 1941. His father, Ashley, worked as a sales representative for a seat insulation company; his mother was Helen (Morris). He was raised in Royal Oak, Michigan, until he was 14 years old, when his family relocated to St. Petersburg, Florida. He attended Bishop Barry High School, graduating in 1959. He initially intended to study at the University of Notre Dame, but did not want to choose between playing football or baseball. He consequently enrolled at the University of Michigan on an athletic scholarship, where he played as catcher on its baseball team and linebacker and end on its football team. He set an all-time Big Ten Conference batting mark of .585 in 1961.

== Major league career ==
Freehan signed with his hometown Tigers in 1961 for a $100,000 bonus, which his father withheld until he graduated from college in 1966. He broke in briefly with four games at the end of the 1961 season before returning to the minors in 1962. In 1963 he arrived in the majors to stay, working with former catcher Rick Ferrell on his defense and splitting catching duties with Gus Triandos, who was traded following the season. The 1964 campaign gave indications of what was to come; becoming the Tigers' full-time catcher with 141 games behind the plate, Freehan batted .300 to finish sixth in the American League (AL), and added 18 home runs and 80 runs batted in. He also led the AL by throwing out 53% of potential base stealers, earned the first of his ten consecutive All-Star selections, and placed seventh in the Most Valuable Player Award balloting. In 1965, he led AL catchers in putouts for the first of six times, and received the first of his five consecutive Gold Gloves. In 1966 he again led the league in putouts, and also led in fielding percentage for the first of four times.

1967 was his best season yet, as he batted .282 – ninth in the AL as averages hit an all-time low – with 20 home runs, and broke Elston Howard's 1964 AL single-season records with 950 putouts and 1,021 total chances. Freehan led the league in both intentional walks (15 of his 73 total walks) and times hit by pitch (20), leading to a career-high .389 on-base percentage. He finished third in the MVP voting after Detroit finished one game behind the Boston Red Sox for the AL pennant.

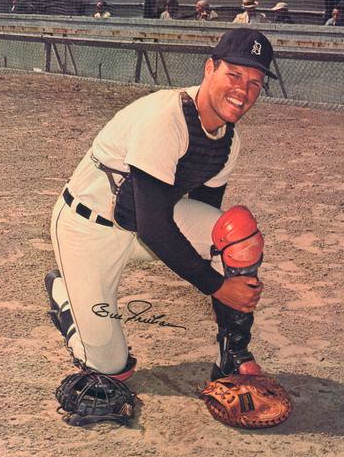
Freehan wearing protective catcher's gear as a member of the Detroit Tigers in 1966.

Freehan had an even better year in 1968 as he was considered the quiet leader of the 1968 World Series championship squad. In a year marked by dominant pitching, he posted career highs with 25 home runs and 84 RBI, fifth and sixth in the AL respectively. Freehan broke his own records with 971 putouts and 1,050 total chances, marks which remained league records until Dan Wilson topped them with the 1997 Seattle Mariners. He was also hit by 24 pitches, the most in the AL since Kid Elberfeld in 1911. Despite playing in hitter-friendly Tiger Stadium, Freehan guided the Tigers' pitching staff to an earned run average of 2.71, third best in the league. McLain won 31 games and Lolich won 17 as the Tigers ran away with the pennant. Because of his offensive and defensive contributions, he finished second to McLain in the MVP voting. Freehan and Carl Yastrzemski were the only players to finish in the top ten of the voting in both 1967 and 1968, and only Yastrzemski reached base more often in 1968. Freehan capped his season by recording the final out of the World Series against the St. Louis Cardinals, retiring Tim McCarver on a popup. He also made a pivotal play in Game 5, with the Cardinals leading the Series 3-1 and the game 3-2. In the fifth inning, Lou Brock – whom Freehan had thrown out on an attempted steal in the third inning – doubled with one out and attempted to score on Julián Javier's single, however Freehan successfully blocked the plate with his foot, and held on to the ball even though Brock came in standing up in an attempt to knock the ball loose. Detroit won by scoring three runs in the seventh inning, and went on to take the last two games.

Although Freehan's later seasons rarely approached the brilliance of those two campaigns, he continued to turn out All-Star years for the Tigers. His offensive numbers dipped in 1970, but he threw out 47% of potential base stealers (his highest mark since 1964) and had a .997 fielding percentage. In 1971, he rebounded at the plate with a .277 batting average and 21 home runs, three of those coming in one game against the Boston Red Sox in August. He hit .262 for the 1972 Eastern Division champions. He missed the first two games (both losses) of the 1972 American League Championship Series against the Oakland Athletics while recovering from a hairline fracture of his thumb, then doubled and homered in a 3-0 Game 3 win, in which Joe Coleman set a League Championship Series record with 14 strikeouts. Freehan drove in the first of three runs in the tenth inning of Game 4 in a memorable 4-3 come-from-behind victory which tied the series; he also drove in Detroit's only run in the 2-1 Game 5 loss. In 1974, splitting time between first base (65 games) and catcher (63 games), he hit .297 and finished fifth in the American League in slugging percentage with a .479 mark. He moved back behind the plate the following year to earn his 11th All-Star berth. Freehan ended his career in 1976, batting .270.

== Career statistics ==
In his 15-year career, Freehan played in 1,774 games with 1,591 hits in 6,073 at bats for a .262 batting average along with 241 doubles, 200 home runs, 758 RBI, and a .340 on-base percentage. In addition to his home runs and total bases, his .412 slugging percentage and totals of 1,591 hits, 706 runs and 476 extra base hits all put him among the top five AL catchers to that time. His batting totals are particularly remarkable in light of the fact offense was at a low throughout the sport during his career, with a decided advantage toward pitchers. Freehan led all AL catchers in fielding percentage four times (1965, 1966, 1970, 1973). He also ranked sixth in American League history with 114 times being hit by a pitch. Freehan caught more games than any other player in Tigers' team history. In his book, The Bill James Historical Baseball Abstract, baseball historian Bill James ranked Freehan 12th all-time among major league catchers.

Freehan held the major league record for highest career fielding percentage (.9933) until 2002, when Dan Wilson broke his record. In 1973 and 1974 he surpassed Yogi Berra to become the AL's all-time leader in putouts and total chances; he broke Johnny Roseboro's major league marks in 1975. Bob Boone broke Freehan's major league mark of 10,734 career total chances in 1987, and Gary Carter surpassed his putouts total of 9,941 in 1988; Carlton Fisk broke his AL records in 1989 (total chances) and 1990 (putouts). Freehan caught 114 shutouts during his career, ranking him 18th all-time among major league catchers.

During the 1969 season, Freehan penned Behind the Mask, a diary-type recording of his thoughts and experiences as seen from the catcher's perspective that saw publication in 1970. He and pitcher Mickey Lolich started 324 games as a battery, at the time more than any other duo since 1900, and a record that stood until Adam Wainwright and Yadier Molina of the St. Louis Cardinals broke it in 2022.

== Post-playing career ==
After retiring as a player, Freehan coached Tigers catcher Lance Parrish on the fine points of playing his position. In 1978, Freehan was one of seven members of the inaugural class of inductees to the University of Michigan Athletic Hall of Honor. He served as a color commentator for Seattle Mariners broadcasts from 1979 to 1980, and for Tigers broadcasts on PASS Sports television from 1984 to 1985. He subsequently returned to the University of Michigan as head coach of the baseball team from 1989 to 1995. He went back to the Tigers as a catching instructor in 2002, serving in that capacity for three seasons before retiring.

== Personal life ==
Freehan married Patricia O’Brien on February 23, 1963. She was the sister of Dan O'Brien and they met while in high school. Together, they had three children: Corey Sue, Kelley, and Cathy. He and his wife relocated to Bloomfield Hills, Michigan, during their later years.

Freehan was diagnosed with Alzheimer's disease in his later years. In October 2018, it was revealed Freehan was in hospice care at his home in Petoskey, Michigan. He died on August 19, 2021, from the disease at the age of 79.

== See also ==
- List of Gold Glove Award winners at catcher
- List of Major League Baseball players who spent their entire career with one franchise
