= Van Patrick =

American sportscaster (1916–1974)

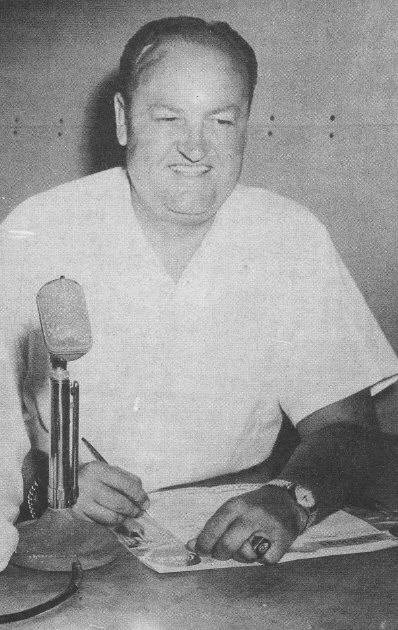
- Van Patrick in the Detroit Tigers broadcast booth (1957)
- Born: August 15, 1916
- Died: September 29, 1974 (aged 58)
- Other name: The Ole Announcer
- Education: Texas Christian University
- Sports commentary career
- Teams: Cleveland Indians (1948); Detroit Tigers (1949, 1952–1959); Detroit Lions (1950–1974), University of Notre Dame
- Genre: Play-by-play
- Sports: Major League Baseball; National Football League

Van Patrick (August 15, 1916 – September 29, 1974) was an American sportscaster, best known for his play-by-play work with the Detroit Lions and Detroit Tigers.

Self-nicknamed "the Ole Announcer", Patrick called Lions games from 1950 until his death in 1974. He had two stints with the Tigers, broadcasting for the team for one season in 1949 and then again from 1952 to 1959.

== Biography ==
Patrick graduated from Texas Christian University (TCU), where he played football with future Washington Redskins quarterback and Pro Football Hall of Fame inductee Sammy Baugh. He also played baseball and basketball at TCU.

After graduating, he began his broadcast career as a baseball play-by-play announcer in various minor leagues, including the International League, the Texas League and the old Southern Association. His first major league play-by-play broadcasting was with the world-champion-to-be Cleveland Indians in 1948. He also called the World Series along with celebrated sportscaster Red Barber. Game 2 of that Series announced by Patrick, won by the Indians, made television history. Telecast live from Braves Field in Boston, it was shown aboard the Baltimore and Ohio Railroad's Marylander passenger train travelling between Washington, D.C., and New York City using a receiver operated by Bendix Corporation technicians. An Associated Press reporter observing the demonstration said, "Technically, it was surprisingly good."

From 1949 to 1953, Patrick was sports director at Detroit station WJR. During the 1960s and 1970s, he was sports director for the Mutual Broadcasting System and broadcast Notre Dame football and Monday Night Football for the network. He also did TV sports news segments during news broadcasts on Detroit's WJBK-TV. He was widely admired for his broadcasting skills during his radio heyday. He did not make the transition to television well, as he was naturally bald and insisted on wearing an inexpensive toupée in television appearances. "Van Patrick's toupée" was a source of many jokes in the Detroit area during that period.

Of special note, on March 8, 1971, along with Mutual colleague Charles King, Patrick handled the live broadcast of the Frazier–Ali "Fight of the Century" round-by-round summaries as they came out over the wire services. At the time of his death in 1974, he owned four radio stations. He died of cancer while preparing to call a Notre Dame football game in South Bend, Indiana.

== Legacy ==
The Notre Dame Club of Chicago established the Van Patrick Award to honor Patrick's memory. Patrick is a Past President of the Detroit Sports Media Association.

| Preceded by None | Monday Night Football national radio play-by-play announcer 1970–1973 | Succeeded by Lindsey Nelson |
