= Detroit SportsNet =

U.S. regional sports network

Ownership
- Owner: Ilitch Holdings; MLB Local Media

History
- Replaced: FanDuel Sports Network Detroit

Links
- Website: tigers.com/watch

Availability

Terrestrial
- Cable and Satellite Viewing Options
- DirecTV: 663-3
- U-Verse: 1739
- Xfinity: 1253
- Spectrum: 213, 291, 436 (varies by region)

Streaming media
- MLB Website: tigers.com/watch
- DirecTV Stream: Internet Protocol television
- FuboTV: Internet Protocol television

Detroit SportsNet, branded as Detroit SportsNet presented by bet365 for sponsorship reasons, is a part-time regional sports network owned by Ilitch Sports + Entertainment in partnership with MLB Local Media. Launched prior to the start of the 2026 Detroit Tigers season, it is the broadcaster of the Detroit Tigers and Detroit Red Wings, replacing FanDuel Sports Network Detroit.

== History ==
In January 2026, Main Street Sports Group's nine remaining regional contracts with MLB teams were terminated due to missed payments, amid financial issues and failed offers to sell the company to DAZN. This impacted the Detroit Tigers, whose regional broadcasts were carried by FanDuel Sports Network Detroit. Pending further developments, it was projected that FanDuel Sports Network might cease operations entirely following the conclusion of the 2025–26 NBA and NHL seasons, which also impacted the Detroit Pistons and Detroit Red Wings. On February 2, 2026, it was reported that at least six of the teams would move their broadcasts to MLB's in-house MLB Local Media unit.

On February 9, Ilitch Sports + Entertainment, which owns both the Tigers and Red Wings, announced that both teams would be served by MLB Local Media beginning in the 2026 and 2026–27 seasons, respectively, with games available via a direct-to-consumer streaming package and partnerships with local television providers. While the Red Wings became the first non-MLB team to be served by MLB Local Media, this is not the first direct partnership between MLB and the NHL; in 2015, MLB's digital arm reached a deal with the NHL to operate its digital platforms, with MLB Network taking over the operations of the league's cable network NHL Network as part of the agreement.

On March 2, Illitch announced that the Tigers and Red Wings would share a joint channel branded as Detroit SportsNet, with both teams also offering direct-to-consumer services via MLB.tv. MLB negotiated with local television providers in Michigan, Indiana, and Ohio to carry the channel. Detroit SportsNet is unique among MLB Local Media's operations by having multiple teams on a branded channel, rather than being a single team "quietly fold[ed] into the league's generic product".

As with other MLB Local Media operations, it operates on a part-time basis, with programming limited to live game broadcasts, pre- and post-game shows, and encore presentations of previous games.

== See also ==
- Similar part-time sports networks in the United States including:
  - Rangers Sports Network
  - BravesVision
