= Globe (disambiguation) =

A globe is a three-dimensional scale model of Earth or other astronomical body.

Globe may also refer to:

- The globe, an alternative name for Earth
- Any other spherical or roughly spherical object, such as a crystal ball

== Places ==
=== Multiple places with the same name ===
- Globe Building (disambiguation)
- Globe Derby Park (disambiguation)
- Globe Hotel (disambiguation)
- Globe Station (disambiguation)
- Globe Theatre (disambiguation)

=== United Kingdom ===
- Globe Arena (football stadium), football stadium in Morecambe, Lancashire, England
- Globe Pit, geological site in Essex, England
- Globe Theatre, the Elizabethan Playhouse associated with William Shakespeare
- Shakespeare's Globe, the modern reconstruction of the Elizabethan Playhouse associated with William Shakespeare

=== United States ===
- Globe, Arizona, a city
- Globe, Kansas, an unincorporated community
- Globe, Rhode Island, a historical village
- Globe, Virginia, an unincorporated village
- Globe, Wisconsin, an unincorporated community

=== Other countries ===
- Avicii Arena, previously known as Stockholm Globe Arena, also known as "Globen", a sports arena
- Globe Cinema (Kolkata), building located in Lindsay Street in Kolkata, West Bengal, India

== Companies and organizations ==
=== Worldwide ===
- Global Leadership and Organizational Behavior Effectiveness Research Project (Project GLOBE), an international group of social scientists
- GLOBE, Global Legislators Organisation for a Balanced Environment
- GLOBE Program, a worldwide hands-on school-based education and science program

=== Philippines ===
- Globe Telecom, a major telecommunications company in the Philippines
- Globe Studios, a Philippine entertainment production company

=== United Kingdom ===
- Globe Rowing Club, a rowing club in Greenwich, an area in the South East of London, England
- Globe (St. Paul's Churchyard), a historical bookseller in London
- Reading globe groups, UK voluntary groups

=== United States ===
- Globe Bikes, a division of Specialized Bicycle Components
- Globe Store, a defunct department store based in Scranton, Pennsylvania
- Globe Locomotive Works, manufacturer based in Boston, Massachusetts
- Globe Aircraft Corporation, American aircraft manufacturer in Fort Worth, Texas
- Globe Life and Accident Insurance Company, an American life and health insurance company
- theGlobe.com, a social networking service of the dotcom boom
- Globe Pequot Press, an American book publisher and distributor

=== Other countries ===
- Globe International, an Australian surf and skateboard footwear and apparel manufacturer
- Global Learning Opportunities in Business Education, a three-school, three-semester international business program based in Denmark
- Globe Soccer Awards, annual awards given for excellence in football given in Dubai, UAE
- Globe Shipbuilding, several companies

== Newspapers ==
- Globe (tabloid), a supermarket tabloid newspaper published in New York City
- Il Globo, Italian newspaper
- O Globo, Brazilian newspaper
- Jakarta Globe, a daily newspaper published in Jakarta, Indonesia
- Le Globe, a defunct 19th century French newspaper
- Globes, a daily financial newspaper published in Tel Aviv

== Music ==
- Globe (band), a Japanese trance/pop-rock group
  - Globe (album), a debut album by Globe
- "Globes", a song by Rustie from his album Glass Swords
- GLOBE (地球儀, Chikyūgi), a Japanese song by P-Model from the album Landsale (album)

== Vessels ==
- CSCL Globe, for a time, the largest container ship in the world
- Globe (ship), several ships

== Other uses ==
- Celestial globe, show the apparent positions of the stars in the sky
- BBC One 'Virtual Globe' ident, known as simply 'Globe' or 'Virtual Globe', a television ident for BBC One
- Globe (comics), a DC Comics supervillain
- Globe (human eye), the human eyeball apart from its appendages
- Lightglobe, synonym for "incandescent light bulb" in Australian English vernacular
- Snow globe, a transparent sphere enclosing a scene or figure
- Le Globe, the first successful gas balloon, launched - unmanned - on 27 August 1783, in Paris, France, also known as La Charlière (after its inventor Jacques Charles).

== See also ==
- Globus (disambiguation)
- Globo (disambiguation)
- Global (disambiguation)
- The Globe (disambiguation)
