= Globus =

Globus is Latin for sphere or globe. It may also refer to:

== Science and technology ==
- Globus pallidus, a sub-cortical structure in the brain
- Globus pharyngeus (also globus sensation or globus hystericus), a feeling of a lump at the back of the throat
- GLOBUS, a radar system in Norway
- Voskhod Spacecraft "Globus" IMP navigation instrument

== Business ==
- Globus (clothing retailer), an Indian clothing retail chain
- Globus (department store), a Swiss department store chain
- Globus Holding, a German retail group that operates hypermarkets and hardware stores under the Globus and Globus Baumarkt brands
- Globus Medical, a medical device company based in Audubon, Pennsylvania

=== Transportation ===
- Tata Globus, a range of buses by Tata Motors
- Globus Airlines, a Russian airline
- Globus family of brands, a group of travel package companies

== Media ==
- Globus (weekly), a political magazine published in Croatia
- Globus (Macedonian magazine)

== People ==
- Amy Globus, American artist and entrepreneur
- Globus, nickname of Odilo Globocnik, a World War II Nazi and SS leader
- Solomon Globus (born 1856), Lithuanian chess master
- Stephen Globus, New York City venture capitalist
- Yoram Globus (born 1941), Israeli film producer

== Other uses ==
- Globus (music), a movie trailer music-inspired band
- Globus cruciger, an orb topped with a cross, a Christian symbol
- Globus Institute for Globalisation and Sustainable Development at Tilburg University, the Netherlands

== See also ==
- Globe (disambiguation)
- Gobus (disambiguation)
