= The Globe =

The Globe may refer to:

- The Globe (album), by the band Big Audio Dynamite II
- "The Globe" (song), by the band Big Audio Dynamite II
- "The Globe", a song by Lisa O'Neill from All of This Is Chance, 2023
- The Boston Globe, a daily newspaper published in Boston
- Globe (tabloid), a supermarket tabloid newspaper published in New York City
- The Globe (Camp Lejeune), the newspaper of U.S. Marine Corps
- The Globe, a newspaper published in Worthington, Minnesota
- The Globe (student newspaper), an independent student newspaper of Point Park University, Pittsburgh
- The New York Globe, a defunct daily newspaper published in New York City
- The Washington Globe, a defunct semi-weekly newspaper published in Washington, D.C.
- The Globe, Moorgate, London
- The Globe and Mail, a daily newspaper published in Toronto, Canada
  - The Globe (Toronto newspaper), the oldest of the predecessors merged into it
- The Globe (London newspaper), a defunct British newspaper founded in 1803 and merged with the Pall Mall Gazette in 1921
- The Globe (Sydney), a defunct daily newspaper published in Sydney, New South Wales, Australia

== See also ==
- Globe (disambiguation)
