= Radio Globo =

Radio Globo may refer to

- Rádio Globo, a Brazilian news radio network
- Radio Globo (Honduras), radio station operating in Tegucigalpa, Honduras
- Radio Globo (Italy), Italian station based in Rome

== See also ==
- Grupo Globo, South American large mass media group founded in Rio de Janeiro, Brazil and with a big number of radio stations and other investments
- Globo (disambiguation)
