= Ernie Harwell =

American sportscaster (1918–2010)

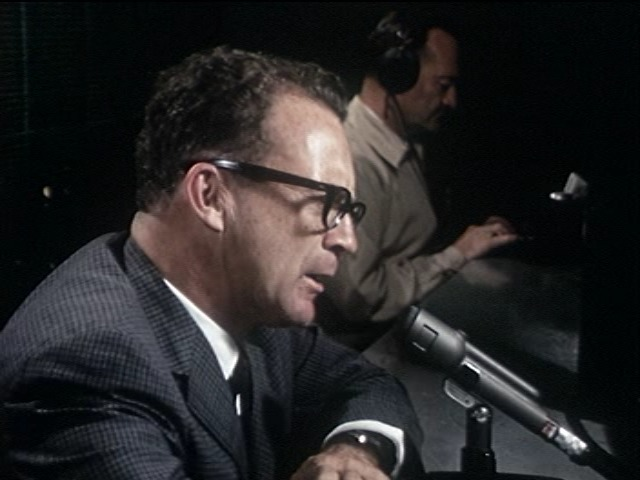
- Harwell in 1966
- Born: William Earnest Harwell; January 25, 1918; Washington, Georgia, U.S.
- Died: May 4, 2010 (aged 92); Novi, Michigan, U.S.
- Education: Emory University (BA)
- Occupation: Sportscaster
- Years active: 1943–2002
- Spouse: Lulu Tankersley (m. 1941)
- Children: 4
- Awards: Ford C. Frick Award (1981)
- Sports commentary career
- Teams: Atlanta Crackers (1943–1948); Brooklyn Dodgers (1948–1949); New York Giants (1950–1953); Baltimore Orioles (1954–1959); Detroit Tigers (1960–1991, 1993–2002); California Angels (1992)
- Genre: Play-by-play
- Sports: Baseball (SA, MLB)

William Earnest Harwell (January 25, 1918 – May 4, 2010) was an American sportscaster, known for his long career calling play-by-play of Major League Baseball games. For 55 seasons, 42 of them with the Detroit Tigers, Harwell broadcast the action on radio and/or television. In January 2009, the American Sportscasters Association ranked him 16th on its list of Top 50 Sportscasters of All Time.

== Biography ==
=== Early life and career ===
Ernie Harwell grew up in Atlanta, Georgia, working in his youth as a paperboy for The Atlanta Georgian; one of his customers was writer Margaret Mitchell. An avid baseball fan from an early age, Harwell became a visiting batboy for the Atlanta Crackers of the Southern Association at the age of five, and never had to buy a ticket to get into a baseball game again. At sixteen he began working as a regional correspondent for The Sporting News.

Harwell attended Emory University, where he was a member of the Sigma Alpha Epsilon fraternity and helped edit The Emory Wheel. After graduating, Harwell worked as a copy editor and sportswriter for The Atlanta Constitution. In 1943, he began announcing games for the Crackers on WSB radio, after which he served four years in the United States Marine Corps. Harwell would leave the service in January 1946 as a sergeant. During his enlistment he was stationed in Camp Lejeune as a writer for The Globe, and later in Washington, D.C. as a writer for Leatherneck.

=== Brooklyn Dodgers, New York Giants, and Baltimore Orioles ===
The Crackers were a Class AA team, two rungs below the majors. Nonetheless, Harwell had achieved considerable notoriety due to the Crackers airing their games on WSB, a 50,000-watt station that reached much of the eastern half of the United States at night. Brooklyn Dodgers general manager and part-owner Branch Rickey was impressed enough with Harwell that he believed he would be an appropriate substitute for longtime Dodgers announcer Red Barber, who was recuperating from a bleeding ulcer.

He was acquired by the Dodgers in 1948 after general manager Branch Rickey arranged an unprecedented deal: Brooklyn traded catcher Cliff Dapper to the Atlanta Crackers in exchange for Harwell's release from his broadcasting contract. It remains the only known instance in Major League Baseball history of a player being traded for a broadcaster.

Harwell broadcast for the Dodgers through 1949, the New York Giants from 1950 to 1953, and the Baltimore Orioles from 1954 to 1959. Harwell was the lead broadcaster on Orioles broadcasts on WCBM-AM and WMAR-TV in 1955, working alongside Chuck Thompson. The next year Thompson moved on to Washington D.C. to broadcast the Senator games until returning to the Orioles in 1962. Early in Harwell's career, he also broadcast The Masters golf tournament, as well as pro and college football.

=== Detroit Tigers ===
Ernie Harwell was honored alongside the retired numbers of the Detroit Tigers in 2000.

Harwell joined the Detroit Tigers' broadcast crew in 1960, replacing Van Patrick after the latter was dismissed owing to a sponsorship change. George Kell, who had begun calling Tigers games with Patrick the year before, and had previously played for the Orioles in 1956–57 while Harwell was announcing their games, was instrumental in bringing Harwell to Detroit. "George called and said, 'I recommended you and the Tigers asked me to get in touch with you.'" Harwell said. "I came and that was it."

Harwell shared TV and radio duties with Kell through 1963, then with Bob Scheffing in 1964. He began working radio exclusively in 1965, teaming with Gene Osborn for two seasons and then with Ray Lane from 1967 to 1972. Paul Carey replaced Lane in 1973, joining Harwell to form the Tigers' best-known and longest-lasting radio team, which lasted until the end of the 1991 season. Harwell gained a large following outside of Detroit because the Tigers aired their games on WJR, a 50,000-watt station that reached most of the eastern half of North America at night.

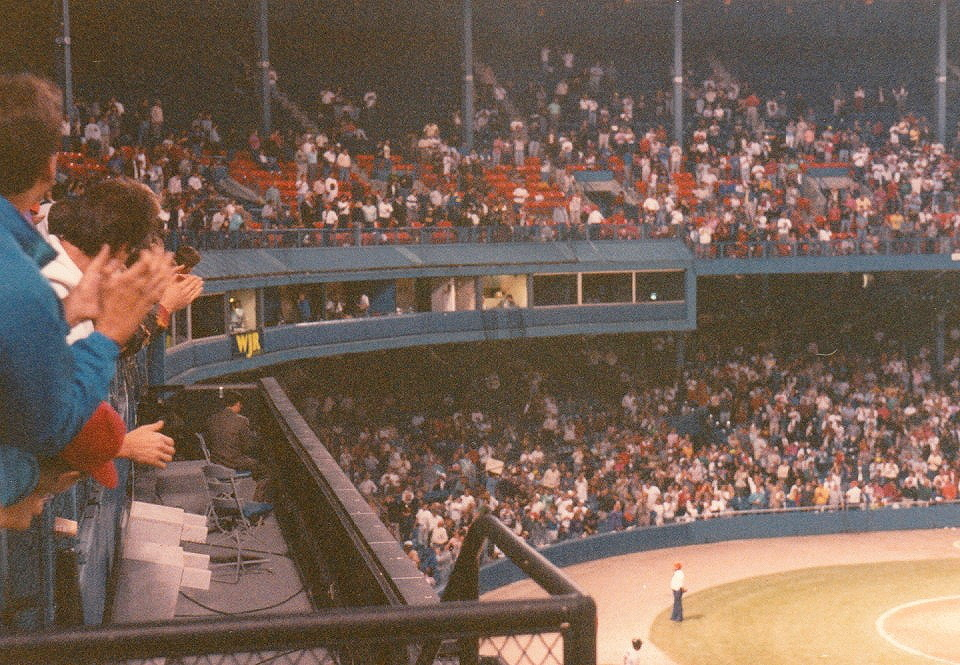
Harwell gets a prolonged standing ovation during his last game in Detroit during the 1991 season

On December 19, 1990, the Tigers and WJR announced that the station wanted to go in a "new direction" and that the 1991 season would be Harwell's last, as his contract was "non-renewed". Carey then announced that he had already planned to retire after the 1991 season and that the decision was unrelated to Harwell's contract situation. Fans across Michigan and throughout the baseball world were outraged, but the ballclub and the radio station (who eventually wound up blaming each other for the decision) stood firm: "[Harwell's situation is] not going to change no matter how much clamor is made over it," said team president Bo Schembechler. The situation caused outrage so much that some made threats of violence against Schembechler. Some, such as Mitch Albom, blamed the situation for causing as much negative feeling as it did on WJR executive Jim Long who was the one who pushed the quick, no severance pay removal of Harwell. The movement in favor of keeping Harwell was so strong that even billboards in favor of his remaining were put up. Rick Rizzs was hired away from the Seattle Mariners to replace Harwell in 1992, teaming with Bob Rathbun.

Harwell worked a part-time schedule for the California Angels in 1992. The following year, the Tigers were purchased by Mike Ilitch, who made it one of his priorities to bring Harwell back. In 1993 Harwell teamed with Rizzs and Rathbun on the WJR broadcasts, calling play-by-play of the middle innings in each game. From 1994 to 1998, Harwell called television broadcasts for the Tigers on PASS Sports, WKBD-TV, and later Fox Sports Detroit (now FanDuel Sports Network Detroit) for select broadcasts. In 1999, he resumed full-time radio duties with the team, swapping roles with Frank Beckmann (who had replaced Rizzs in the radio booth following the 1994 season), teaming with analyst Jim Price, and continuing in that role even as the team's radio rights changed from WJR to WXYT in 2001. During spring training in 2002, he announced that he would retire at the end of the season; his final broadcast came on September 29, 2002. Dan Dickerson, who had joined Harwell and Price in 2000, took over as the Tigers' lead radio voice the following year.

=== National broadcast work ===
Harwell's broadcast for the Giants of the third and final game of the 1951 National League tie-breaker series against the Dodgers, which ended with the pennant-clinching "Shot Heard 'Round the World" home run by the Giants' Bobby Thompson, was carried nationally on NBC television.

Harwell helped broadcast two All-Star Games (1958, 1961) and two World Series (1963, 1968) for NBC Radio, numerous ALCS and ALDS for CBS Radio and ESPN Radio, and the CBS Radio Game of the Week from 1992 to 1997. He also called the 1984 World Series locally for the Tigers and WJR. For CBS TV's coverage of the 1991 World Series, Harwell narrated an opening prologue prior to Game 1 and a closing epilogue (an excerpt from A. Bartlett Giamatti's "The Green Fields of the Mind") after Game 7.

=== Post-retirement broadcasting works ===
Following his retirement, Harwell came back briefly in 2003 to call a Wednesday Night Baseball telecast on ESPN, as part of that network's "Living Legends" series of guest announcers. In 2005, Harwell guested for an inning on the Fox network's coverage of the All-Star Game (which was held in Detroit for the first time since 1971), as well as an inning on the ESPN Radio broadcast. For Game 3 of the 2006 American League Division Series between the Tigers and New York Yankees, he provided guest commentary on ESPN's telecast for two innings, called an inning of play-by-play on the Tigers' radio flagship WXYT, and guested for an inning on ESPN Radio. Harwell also called an inning of Game 1 of the 2006 World Series for WXYT.

Harwell served as a guest color commentator for two Tiger games on FSN Detroit on May 24 and 25, 2007. Harwell worked the telecasts (alongside play-by-play man Mario Impemba) as a substitute for regular analyst Rod Allen, who took the games off to attend his son's high school graduation. (Harwell had filled in for Allen once before, on a 2003 telecast.)

He also appeared as a guest on an ESPN Sunday Night Baseball telecast in Detroit on July 1, 2007.

Harwell occasionally did vignettes on the history of baseball for Fox Sports Detroit's magazine program Tigers Weekly.

=== Writing ===
Beyond broadcasting, Harwell was a prolific writer. His 1955 essay "The Game for All America," first published in The Sporting News, has been repeatedly anthologized and is regarded as a classic reflection on baseball's role in American culture. He authored multiple memoirs and collections, including Tuned to Baseball (1985) and Stories from My Life in Baseball (2001), blending autobiography with reflections on the game's evolution.

== Broadcasting style ==
Harwell was known for his low-key delivery, southern accent (Detroit "Ti-guhs"), and conversational style. Some of his trademark phrases were:

- "That one is long gone!" (His trademark home run call, with an emphasis on "long")
- "He stood there like the house by the side of the road, and watched it go by." (After a called strikeout)
- "Called out for excessive window shopping." (Also after a called strikeout)
- "It's two for the price of one!" (After a double play)
- "A fan from [insert a city] will be taking that ball home today." (When a fan would catch a foul ball)
- "The Tigers need instant runs." (When the team was behind in the late innings)

Harwell would also open his first spring training broadcast of each season with a reading from Song of Solomon 2:11-12 (KJV): "For lo, the winter is past, the rain is over and gone; the flowers appear on the earth; the time of the singing of birds is come, and the voice of the turtle is heard in our land."

== Non-broadcast activities ==
Harwell's 1955 essay "The Game for All America", originally published in The Sporting News and reprinted numerous times, is considered a classic of baseball literature. He also authored several books, including Life After Baseball, Tuned to Baseball, and Breaking 90: Nine Decades Young and Still Loving Baseball. He was an occasional columnist for the Detroit Free Press.

Harwell also wrote popular music. His first recorded song was "Upside Down" on the Something Stupid album by Homer and Jethro in the mid-1960s. In the liner notes of the album, it says: "Detroit Tiger baseball announcer wrote this one, and we think it's a fine observation of the world today, as seen from the press box at Tiger Stadium. We were up there with Ernie one day and from there the world looks upside down. The Mets were on top in the National League." All told, 66 songs written by Ernie Harwell have been recorded by various artists. "Needless to say, I have more no-hitters than Nolan Ryan." – Ernie Harwell in an article published May 31, 2005, in the Detroit Free Press

Harwell made a cameo appearance in the 1994 film Cobb and in the made-for-television movies Aunt Mary (1979), Tiger Town (1983), and Cooperstown (1993). His voice can be briefly heard in the films Paper Lion (1968) and One Flew Over the Cuckoo's Nest (1975) and in the TV movie The Five People You Meet in Heaven (2004). Harwell appeared as an interview subject in the 1998 documentary film The Life and Times of Hank Greenberg and contributed to numerous other baseball-themed documentaries and retrospectives over the years.

The 1997 text-based computer simulation game APBA for Windows: Broadcast Blast features play-by-play commentary by Harwell.

Harwell served as a spokesman for Blue Cross-Blue Shield of Michigan. His contract with the organization, which began in 2003, ran for ten years with an option for another ten. Had Harwell fulfilled the entire contract (by which time he would have been 95 years old), Blue Cross had pledged to extend it for yet another decade. Harwell formerly ran a blog about healthy living and fitness for BCBS. He retired from it on March 5, 2009.

A devout Christian (he was born again at a 1961 Billy Graham crusade), Harwell was long involved with Baseball Chapel, an evangelistic organization for professional ballplayers.

In 2004, the Detroit Public Library dedicated a room to Ernie Harwell and his wife, Lulu, which will house Harwell's collection of baseball memorabilia valued at over two million dollars.

On April 26, 2008, Harwell was presented with an Honorary Doctorate of Humane Letters from The University of Michigan at their Spring Commencement ceremony. One week later, on May 3, 2008, he was presented with another Honorary Degree of Laws this time from Wayne State University.

In late 2008, Harwell began to appear in television public service announcements for the Michigan Association of Broadcasters, advising viewers about the Digital television transition in the United States.

Harwell was a member of the Old Tiger Stadium Conservancy Board, an organization that attempted to save portions of Tiger Stadium. He offered to donate a large portion of his historic collection of baseball memorabilia, which he had collected over the course of his storied career, if part of Tiger Stadium could have been saved for a museum.

Harwell lived in Farmington Hills, Michigan, and moved to Novi in the late 1990s, where he lived until his death. Up until just before his death, he still exercised regularly, did sit-ups, used a treadmill, and lifted weights.

== Awards and honors ==
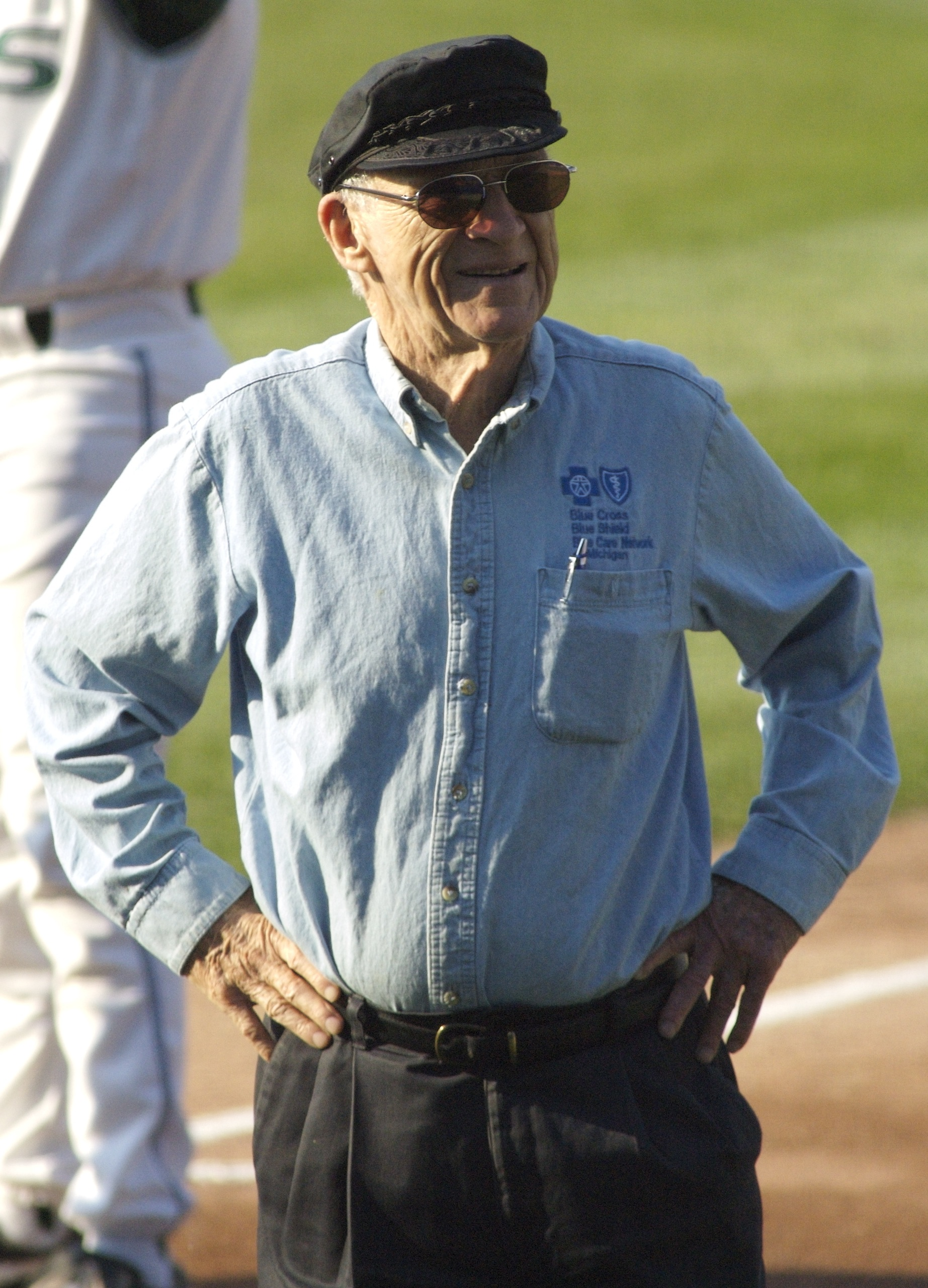
Harwell in 2006.

The National Sportscasters and Sportswriters Association named Harwell as Michigan Sportscaster of the Year 19 times, and inducted him into its Hall of Fame in 1989. In 1991, Harwell was inducted into the American Sportscasters Association Hall of Fame. Harwell was also honored by the Baseball Hall of Fame in 1981 as the fifth broadcaster to receive its Ford C. Frick Award, and was elected to the Michigan Sports Hall of Fame and the National Radio Hall of Fame in 1998, among many other honors. In 2001, Harwell was the recipient of the prestigious Ty Tyson Award for Excellence in Sports Broadcasting, awarded by the Detroit Sports Media Association (DSMA). In 2009, Harwell was named the first recipient of the DSMA's Ernie Harwell Lifetime Contribution Award (the "Ernie".) The award honor individuals from sports media who have contributed outstanding time and effort to the betterment of sports broadcasting through a lifetime body of work. He was named a Lifetime Member of the Detroit Sports Media Association. Emory University inducted Harwell to its Hall of Fame in 1990. The Georgia Sports Hall of Fame inducted Harwell in 2008. In 2010 Harwell was named as a recipient of the Vin Scully Lifetime Achievement Award from Fordham University radio station WFUV. The press box at Detroit's Comerica Park was officially named the "Ernie Harwell Media Center" following his retirement from broadcasting. The Cleveland Indians also named their visiting radio booth at Progressive Field after Harwell. The site of Tiger Stadium at one time had a sign on the fence as "Ernie Harwell Park", but it is not currently or officially a city park.

In addition to professional accolades, Harwell's cultural impact was commemorated in Detroit with a life-sized bronze statue outside Comerica Park, unveiled in 2011. His voice has also been sampled in local music and frequently cited in retrospectives on the city's sports history.

=== Harwell Field ===
On June 6, 2013, the Wayne State University Department of Athletics in conjunction with the Ernie Harwell Estate and the Ernie Harwell Foundation announced the establishment of the Harwell Field Project.

This project is an outreach effort that built a baseball stadium in recognition of Ernie and his wife of 62 years, Lula "Lulu" Harwell. Harwell Field has grandstands, press box, team clubhouse and a foyer to recognize the achievements and contributions of the Harwells.

== Illness and death ==
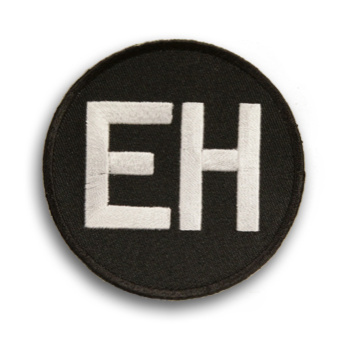
Ernie Harwell commemorative patch worn by the Tigers in 2010.

On September 3, 2009, Harwell announced that he had been diagnosed with incurable bile duct cancer, and that he, his family and doctors had decided against surgery or other treatment of the condition. On September 16, Harwell gave a farewell address to fans at Comerica Park between innings of a game between the Tigers and the Kansas City Royals.

Harwell sat down for a 60-minute interview on an episode of MLB Network's Studio 42 with Bob Costas, his final television appearance. The episode premiered November 17, 2009. In the interview, Costas correctly foresaw the 2009 World Series would unfortunately be Harwell's last.

Harwell died on May 4, 2010, at his home in Novi, Michigan, surrounded by his wife of 68 years, Lulu, and three of their four children.

He was set to receive the Vin Scully Lifetime Achievement Award in Sports Broadcasting on May 5 in New York City. Harwell considered Scully to be the best broadcaster of all time. However, in accepting the award on Harwell's behalf, Al Kaline noted "We Tiger fans respectfully disagree."

Harwell lay in repose at Comerica Park on May 6. Over 10,000 fans filed past the open casket. May 10 was declared Ernie Harwell Day at Comerica Park. Several players and broadcasters hoisted a flag in center field bearing his initials, similar to the ones that were also sewn onto all Tigers uniforms. Harwell's longtime broadcasting partner Paul Carey threw out the ceremonial first pitch that night.

== Bibliography ==
- (1985). Tuned to Baseball. Lanham, MD: Rowman & Littlefield. ISBN 0-912083-10-7
- (1993). Ernie Harwell's Diamond Gems, edited by Geoff Upward. Ann Arbor, MI: Momentum Books. ISBN 0-9618726-7-5
- (1995). The Babe Signed My Shoe: Baseball As It Was – And Will Always Be, edited by Geoff Upward. South Bend, IN: Diamond Communications. ISBN 0-912083-72-7
- (2001). Stories from My Life in Baseball. Detroit, MI: Detroit Free Press. ISBN 0-937247-35-9
- (2002). Ernie Harwell: My 60 Years in Baseball, with Tom Keegan. Chicago, IL: Triumph Books. ISBN 1-57243-451-1
- (2004). Life After Baseball. Detroit, MI: Detroit Free Press. ISBN 0-937247-45-6
- (2006). Ernie Harwell's Audio Scrapbook, by Ernie Harwell and Bob Harris. Grosse Pointe, MI: AudioBook Publishing. ISBN 0-9792120-0-6
- (2007). Breaking 90. Detroit, MI: Detroit Free Press. ISBN 0-937247-77-4
