= Gyula Shakespeare Festival =

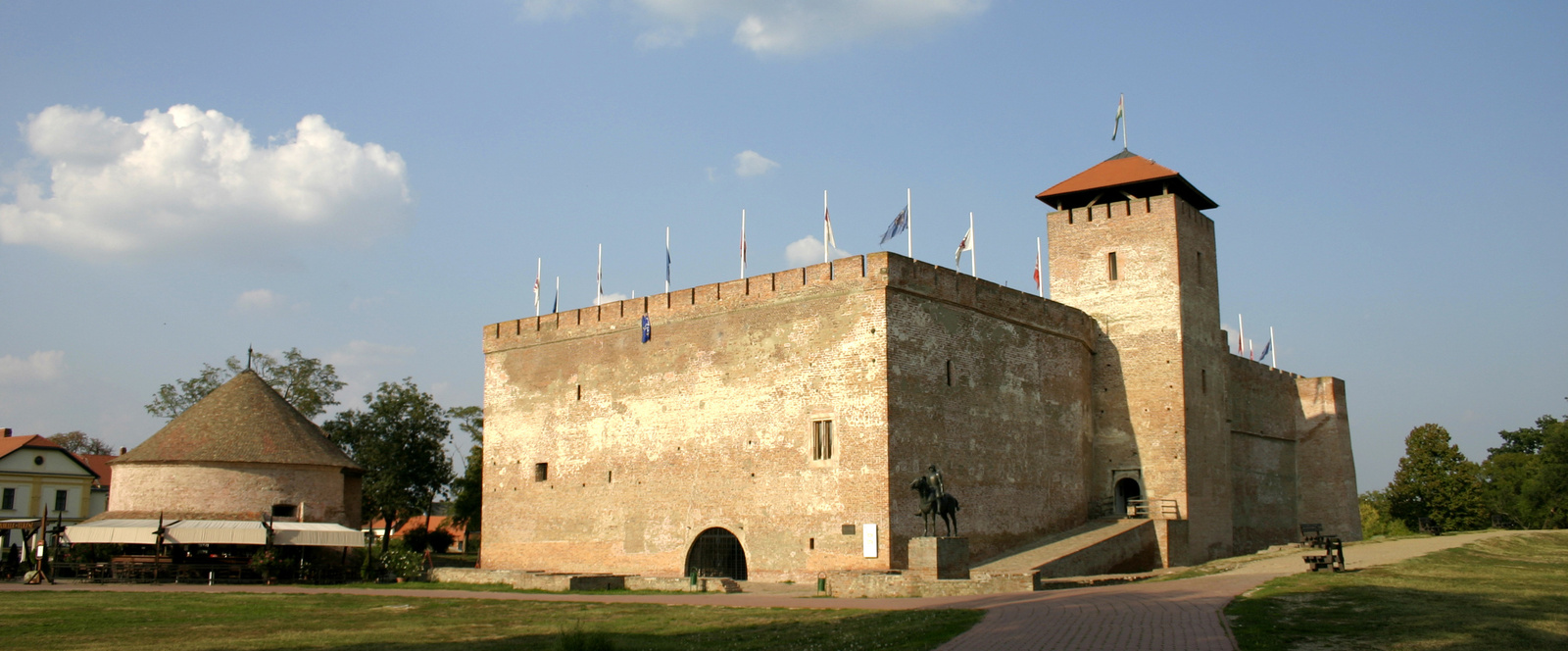
The Gyula Castle

The Gyula Shakespeare Festival is a one-week to two-week long, international Festival organised annually since 2005 in Gyula, Hungary. Organizers of the Festival have been József Gedeon (2005–2016), Marianna Varga (2016–2017), and Tibor Elek (2017–present).

== Background ==
The man behind the festival, József Gedeon, was also the manager of the Castle Theatre in Gyula, as well as a “member and founder of many Hungarian and international art associations”. In a 2014 interview with behir.hu, Gedeon stated that his love for Theatre started at a very young age when his parents took him for the first time to the Gyula Castle Theatre. From a teacher of English and Hungarian language to a director, Gedeon founded numerous local and international clubs throughout his life. In 1995, he became the director of the Castle Theatre. After his death in 2016, Tibor Elek took over as the main organiser and artistic director of the Festival. Similarly to his predecessor, Elek worked as a teacher before undertaking more artistic endeavours.

The main goal of the organisers behind the Festival was the establishment of a prestigious, international Festival in Hungary, to which the most significant Shakespeare productions would be invited both from within and without the country. The main programme – along with the Shakespeare production in the Castle Theatre – consists of a Hungarian and two international productions. In addition to this, there are multiple accompanying programmes enriching the experience, such as renaissance music concerts, jazz concerts, dance performances, alternative theatrical performances, film screenings, Shakespeare conferences, and even gastronomic events. The programmes and productions of the Festival can be attended in many places throughout the city, most notably in the court of the castle or at the lake-stage. “Each year the Shakespeare Festival contains one new production from Gyula, presented several times.”

== Festivals over the years ==
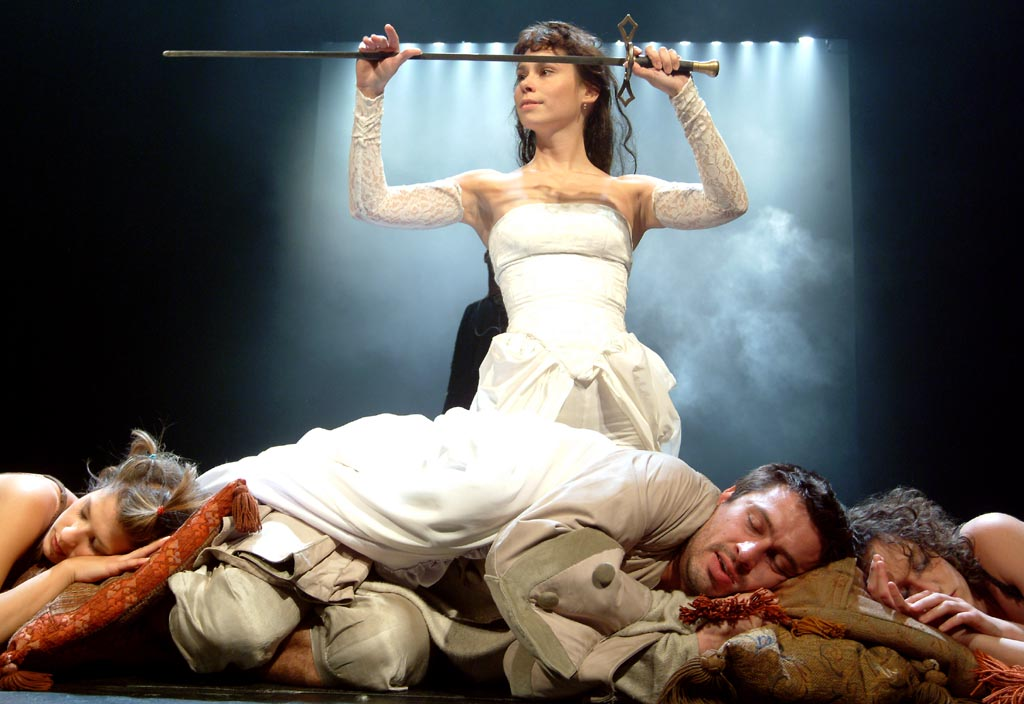
Play from 2007: A Midsummer Night's Dream

2005 – the I Shakespeare Festival: The very first festival, which also established the structure of future festivals. The main programme included the production of the play entitled wwW.Shakespeare.hu directed by Attila Vidnyánszky, which was an amalgamation of three Shakespearean plays, as well as of the playwright’s life. Another segment of the main programme was the reading of Shakespeare Sonnets, edited and directed by Miklós Benedek. Additionally, participants of the Festival had the opportunity to view the critically acclaimed Sfântu Gheorghe adaptation of Othello directed by László Bocsárdi. Side programmes included concerts by the band Simply English, as well as by the Corvinus Band, and a conference titled “The Hungarian Shakespeare”, which focused on the translation of Shakespeare plays.

2006 – the II Shakespeare Festival: As part of the main programme, attendees had the opportunity to view such significant plays as Eimuntas Nekrošius’ (performed by Meno Fortas) and Robert Sturua’s (performed by the Rustaveli National Theatre) Hamlet adaptations, as well as Tim Carroll’s version of Hamlet performed by the Bárka Theatre. Side programmes included a Macbeth dance performance by the Győri Balett on the lake-stage, and a concert by the English King’s Singers.

2007 – the III Shakespeare Festival: this year’s festival opened with a King Lear production directed by János Szász, which was performed on the Castle Stage. As another part of the main programme, the director of the National Hungarian Theatre from Kolozsvár, Gábor Tompa organised a week-long workshop titled “Hamlet, or the Purpose of Staging”. A notable side programme of the III Festival was an exhibition of the costumes and decorations of Shakespeare plays in the Castle Theatre’s Chamber room. Additionally, visitors had the opportunity to view films based upon Shakespeare’s work.

2008 – the IV Shakespeare Festival: the IV Festival’s main programme included an outside performance of Romeo and Juliet by the Globe Theatre behind the building of the Castle Theatre, as well as a Richard III adaptation directed by Gábor Tompa. Moreover, Macbeth (directed by Eimuntas Nekrošius) was performed by the Meno Fortas Theatre Company. Side programmes included a puppet-show of Hamlet for children, a Hamlet ballet performance to Tchaikovsky’s music, and a no-theatre performance from Japan of The Winter’s Tale.

2009 – the V Shakespeare Festival: this year’s Festival opened with a performance entitled “Love is My Sin”, in which famous actors Natasha Perry and Bruce Myers performed Shakespeare’s Sonnets. Attendees also had the chance to see Emma Kirkby with the London Baroque. Notable performances of this year included a Polish adaptation of The Taming of the Shrew, which was declared the best play of 2008/2009, and a performance of Macbeth directed by Armen Khandikyan from Yerevan.

2010 – the VI Shakespeare Festival: the VI Festival opened with a German performance by the Swiss Schauspielhaus Zürich Theatre titled Warum, Warum – Why, Why. This performance contemplated such questions as the purpose of theatre, its roots, and its function in the lives of the audience and the actors. This year’s programme also featured an adaptation of King Lear performed by an all-female cast and directed by Andrei Serban. Additionally, famous English actor Michael Pennington performed a one-person act titled Sweet William. Another one-person act was performed by Bea von Malchus, who in his adaptation of Henry VIII played dozens of characters by himself.

2011 – the VII Shakespeare Festival: the main programme of the VII Festival featured a performance of Troilus and Cressida directed by Csaba Horvát and played by members of the National Theatre, as well as of the Forte Company. Moreover, visitors could view Twelfth Night, or What You Will directed by Robert Sturua, The Tempest directed by Oskaras Korsunovas, as well as a Korean production of A Midsummer Night's Dream performed by the Yohangza Company. Side programmes included a concert by the Musician of the Globe from London titled “Nutmeg and Ginger”, as well as a “Jazzonnet” (jazz+sonnet) concert by Zoltán Lantos and the band OpenSource.

2012 – the VIII Shakespeare Festival: this year’s festival focused on one of Shakespeare’s comedies, The Tempest. Consequently, the VIII Festival featured numerous adaptations of The Tempest, most notably Silviu Purcarete’s version performed by the Craiova National Theatre. Moreover, due to the success of the Korean productions of last year’s festival, director Oh Tae Suh from Seoul brought to stage his adaptation of The Tempest with the help of the Mokwha Repertory Company. Side programmes of the VIII Festival were a dance performance by the Central European Dance Company based upon The Tempest. Additionally, Kossuth Prize winner György Vukán performed a jazz concert simply entitled “The Tempest”, and Zsolt Mátyás with his fellow-artists set Shakespeare’s sonnets to music.

2013 – the IX Shakespeare Festival: in 2013 the focus of the Festival was placed on Hamlet, as well as the sonnets. New Hamlet was performed on the Castle stage by the Tamási Áron Theatre directed by the UNITER-award winner László Bocsárdi. The other Hamlet productions were performed by students of the University of Theatre and Film directed by Sándor Zsótér; and by Miskolc National Theatre directed by Csaba Kiss, respectively. This year’s festival also featured The Taming of the Shrew (directed by Sorin Militaru) and Measure for Measure (directed by Jurij Butuszov). Moreover, this year’s programme included a reading of a compilation of Shakespeare’s writings by Emil Boroghina entitled “All the World's a Stage, And all the Men and Women Merely Players”.

2014 – the X Shakespeare Festival: the X Festival opened with a production of A Midsummer Night's Dream (directed by David Doiashvili) as a collaboration project between the Castle Theatre and the National Theatre. Other notable performances were Macbeth/Anatomy by the Maladype Theatre, an adaptation of King Lear directed by Bertalan Bagó and performed by Vörösmarty Theatre from Székesfehérvár, and a performance of Much Ado about Nothing by the Globe Theatre. Side programmes included a photo exhibition in the Chamber Room, and a concert by Caroll Vanwelden based on her new record titled “Sonnets II”. The sonnets received even more attention in a collaboration project between the W.H. band and the slam-poet Márk “Saiid” Süveg.

2015 – the XI Shakespeare Festival: the Festival of 2015 opened with a Chinese adaptation of Richard III directed by Wang Xiaoying and performed by the Chinese National Theatre. Another Richard III adaptation was also featured this year, which was directed by Ádám Burák. Moreover, this year’s festival-goers had the opportunity to see Sándor Zsótér’s version of Othello titled W.S. Othello – the Black Moor. Side programmes featured a concert by the Hungarian Renaissance Band led by Róbert Mandel, a dance performance of Romeo and Juliet to the music of Tchaikovsky by the Ballet Dancers of Miskolc, as well as a conference entitled “Who was Shakespeare?”.

2016 – the XII Shakespeare Festival: with the coming of the XII Festival, the Gyula Shakespeare Festival officially stepped into “adolescence” – coincidentally, the focus of this year’s festival was placed on the younger Shakespeare fans. Notable performances of the XII Festival were an adaptation of Richard III by Attila Vidnyánszky, Thomas Ostermeier’s Hamlet, Oskaras Koršunovas’s adaptation of Measure for Measure (performed by the Drama Theatre from Warsaw), an adaptation of As You Like It directed by Dánial D. Kovács (and performed by the Katona József Theatre), and the Festival’s own production of Richard III. Additionally, attendees could partake in a conference titled “Shakespeare is Sitting”, the topics of which were interpretations, adaptations, as well as commentaries regarding Shakespeare’s works.

2017 – the XIII Shakespeare Festival: the programme of the XIII Festival kicked off with a dance performance of A Midsummer Night's Dream, choreographed by Noémi Kulcsár. This was considered a rather special occasion because this was the first time A Midsummer Night's Dream was performed as a dance show at the Festival. The most notable international production of this year was an adaptation of King Lear from Israel. Moreover, notable productions, such as Richard III directed by Sándor Zsótér, and Comedy of Errors directed by László Bocsárdi were also presented during the 2017 Festival. Additionally, a project titled “Shakespeare, Sonnet 66” – directed by Kokan Mladenoovic – was performed by the Csiky Gergely National Hungarian Theatre.

2018 – the XIV Shakespeare Festival: This Festival was given the nickname “Shakespeare and Company” because the focus was on different Hamlet adaptations. Unlike the former festivals, Festival XIV started with a photo exhibition commemorating the Hamlet productions of the past decades, and closed with the Festival’s own production of Rosencrantz and Guildenstern are Dead by Tom Stoppard. On the stage Hamletman Monodrama by Imre Baksa could be seen and the Italian Teatro Potlach performed on the lake-stage. The Hamlet production of the Comedy Theatre was part of the festival programme but due to technical reasons it could not be performed in Gyula. Instead, the audience was transported to Budapest, and, as a result, 128 people travelled there to view the production. The organisers hoped that, since along with Romeo and Juliet, Hamlet is usually part of school curriculum, the XIV Festival programme would attract younger audiences. Along with the main programmes, there was a workshop for students and screenings of Hamlet films. The special guests of this year’s Festival were the Tiger Lillies who are well-known for the sadness, black humour and immense beauty expressed through their art.

2019 – the XV Festival: the focus of the XV Shakespeare Festival was placed on the comedies of Shakespeare, and it received the nickname “Cheerful Shakespeare”. This decision narrowed down the choice of potential productions and programmes, as usually more performances are created from the tragedies. As a result, no more than four comedies were performed on stage: Much Ado About Nothing; Twelfth Night, or What You Will; A Midsummer Night's Dream; and The Tempest. Due to the reduced number of potential sources for adaptations, the festival-goers had the opportunity to examine these plays in a more thorough manner. Twelfth Night, for instance, was performed three times. This year’s conference was focused on the theme of “Cheerful Shakespeare” as well, and topics ranging from sexuality to the dilemmas caused by the translation difficulties of the strangely comic scenes in Romeo and Juliet.

2020 – the XVI Festival: similarly to any other events involving numerous participants, the 2020 Shakespeare Festival did not escape the difficulties caused by the COVID epidemic either. Prepared for the unexpected, as well as for additional restrictions, Tibor Elek described this year’s programme as “version C of plan D”. As a result, the XVI Festival was relatively shorter with three productions in July and one Hamlet adaptation in August. On the fourth of July an adaptation of the Comedy of Errors (directed by Dániel Dicső) was performed on the lake-stage, into which the popular pop song, Sweet Dreams by Eurythmics was incorporated. The programme also featured a Gesamtkunswerk production entitled Lovely Day, Hideous Night performed by the band Tercina, as well as by the actors Anna Györgyi and Tamás Széles. In it, the musical (consisting of Renaissance works by Dowland, Holborne, Locke, and Byrd) and prosaic bits (featuring segments from Shakespeare’s sonnets and dramas) alternated between each another. The last segment of the July programme was a performance by IN-PACT – that is, by opera singer Mónika Kertész and choreographer Gábor Halász– titled Desdemonium, which focused on the now universal passion of Desdemona. This performance demonstrated the issue of miscommunication between the sexes through song and dance. Although the 2020 Festival was markedly shorter, it still succeeded in providing productions to entertain and intrigue festival-goers.
