= Francis van der Weegen =

Dutch artist (1854–1930)

- Born: 1854
- Died: 1930 (aged 75–76)
- Known for: Landscape
- Spouse: Sophia

Francis van der Weegen (c. 1854 – 1930) was a Dutch artist who worked in the Netherlands and England primarily painting landscapes. He has five works listed by ArtUK. A further four works are recorded as being sold at auction.

He was married to Sophia with a daughter, Gabriella, who was herself married to Herbert Aldridge Abbot who was headmaster of Eggars Grammar School (Alton Hampshire). van der Weegen painted a number of landscapes of the school and the area around Alton. Abbot moved to Thurrock to become headmaster of Palmer's College in Grays, Essex. van der Weegen painted at least two landscapes of the area south of the college.

== Collections ==
Van der Weegen's work is held in the permanent collections of the Hampshire County Council's Fine Art Collection, Winchester, and the Thurrock Museum, Essex, England.
