= Il Pulcino Pio =

"Il pulcino Pio"

Single by Pulcino Pio

from the album Il Pulcino Pio & Friends
- Language: Italian
- Released: July 18, 2012
- Genre: Children's song
- Length: 2:40
- Label: Globo Records
- Composers: uncertain (by SIAE is ascribed to Pedro Alberto Farías Gómez, But the Music Video for the "revenge" version states Erisvaldo Da Silvia)
- Lyricists: Alessandro Tirocchi; Bruno Benvenuti; Lucio Scarpa; Maurizio Paniconi; Morgana Giovannetti

Music video
- "Il Pulcino Pio" on YouTube

Music video
- "Il Pulcino Pio" (alternative video) on YouTube

"Il Pulcino Pio" (in English version titled as "The Little Chick Cheep") is an Italian song released as a single on 18 July 2012 on Globo Records by the Rome radio station Radio Globo. The song was interpreted by Morgana Giovannetti, an actress and host of the station.

The song became a hit single in Italy, topping the FIMI Singles Chart and staying at top for 8 consecutive weeks (August–October 2012). It also became a hit in France, Spain, the Netherlands, and other European countries in their respective local language versions.

It is a remake of a Brazilian children's song from the 1950s post-war period, known by various names, including "Na Minha Casa Tem...", "A Minha Velha (Tem um Pintinho)", "O Pintinho Piu".

== Origins ==
The original song has its origins in a children's poem linked to Brazilian folklore, known in the early 20th century as A Minha Velha. The song begins by telling that a minha velha has a hen that goes "có" and the chick "pío", and gradually adds that she has a rooster, a turkey, a guinea fowl, a ram, a puppy, and a cat. {{refn|Jorge Luiz de Souza (June 4, 2016). "Nairzinha: o pintinho piu". avosidade (in Portuguese). One of the oldest studio-recorded versions was Minha Véia, performed by Laila Curi in 1958. (Note: Minha Véia on YouTube) The oldest Spanish version was released in 1972 under the name Cantan los pollitos, heading the album of the same name and performed by the group Los Pollitos. (Note: Cantan los pollitos on YouTube)

== Background ==
The rights to the song were acquired by Globo Records S.r.l. The song was produced by Bruno Benvenuti and Max Moroldo. Lyrics were translated into Italian by Bruno Benvenuti, Lucio Scarpa, Alessandro Tirocchi, and Maurizio Paniconi. Vocals were provided by Morgana Giovannetti.

Radio Globo had previously scored a hit by releasing its own version of "Mr. Saxobeat", featuring Maurizio Paniconi, Alessandro Tirocchi, and Morgana Giovannetti and produced by Lucio Scarpa. Named "Radio Globo Morning Show – Mr. Saxobeat Ostia Beach version"). the Radio Globo Italian version.

The station followed up with "Il pulcino Pio", featuring Morgana Giovannetti, during their Morning Show, based on a Brazilian tune. In similar fashion to "Old MacDonald Had a Farm", "Il pulcino Pio" features sounds of a chick, a hen, a rooster, a turkey, a pigeon, a cat, a dog, a goat, a lamb, a cow and a bull. However, in the Brazilian Portuguese version, a deer is included, a lamb is replaced by a billy goat, and the pigeon is replaced with a guinea fowl and the bull being renamed by ox. The song culminates with a tractor hitting and running over the chirping chick.

== Reception ==
After the huge success of the Italian version of the song, a more racy faster version was produced with an accompanying music video by Do It Yourself Multimedia Group S.r.l., with animation created by Federico Mancosu. It was launched online in May 2012. The YouTube music video for the Spanish version of the song attracted more than 6 million views in the three months that followed and has been viewed over 1.7 billion times as of June 2026. After the popularity of the single in France, a compilation album was released in February 2013 called Piou Piou Dance Party (2013) featuring a number of local French and international hits of the previous year. The album entered the SNEP French Albums Chart at #10 in its first week of release.

On 17 September 2012, Radio Globo launched an alternative version called "La Vendetta" in which the chirping chick takes revenge on the tractor that ran over it in the original music video. The Pulcino Pio character and distinctive voice was used in other releases as well in different settings. For example, the follow-up single "Superstar" features Pulcino Pio, now a big star.

== Charts ==
Besides Italy, the song has charted in other countries. In November 2012, the French station NRJ promoted the song heavily resulting in chart success in France.

=== Weekly charts ===
Chart (2012–13)	Peak position
Austria (Ö3 Austria Top 40)	23
Belgium (Ultratop 50 Flanders)	5
Belgium (Ultratip Bubbling Under Wallonia)	15
France (SNEP)	9
Germany (GfK)	10
Italy (FIMI)	1
Netherlands (Dutch Top 40)	2
Netherlands (Single Top 100)	2
Spain (Promusicae)	7

=== Year-end charts ===
Chart (2012)	Position
France (SNEP)	163
Italy (FIMI)	3

Chart (2013)	Position
Belgium (Ultratop Flanders)	77
France (SNEP)	118
Germany (Official German Charts)	87
Netherlands (Dutch Top 40)	56
Netherlands (Single Top 100)	49

== Certifications ==
Region	Certification	Certified units/sales
Italy (FIMI)	5× Platinum	150,000^{‡}
Mexico (AMPROFON)	3× Platinum	180,000^{*}
^{*} Sales figures based on certification alone.^{‡} Sales+streaming figures based on certification alone.
