= Globe Building =

Globe Building may refer to:

- Globe Building (Saint Paul), the headquarters of the former Saint Paul Globe newspaper that was located in downtown Saint Paul, Minnesota, United States
- Globe Building (Minneapolis), a building that was in downtown Minneapolis, Minnesota that was also associated with the Saint Paul Globe
- Globe Building, Beebe Building and Hotel Cecil, located in downtown Seattle, Washington, United States
- William H. Wright Building, a razed building in downtown Toronto, Ontario, Canada that was home to The Globe and Mail and was a notable example of Streamline Moderne architecture
- Globe Building (St. Louis), the home of the former St. Louis Globe-Democrat and now an office and data center building in downtown St. Louis, Missouri, United States
