= Globe Hotel =

Globe Hotel or The Globe Hotel may refer to:

- Globe Hotel (McDonough, Georgia), listed on the U.S. National Register of Historic Places (NRHP)
- The Globe Hotel (Spokane, Washington), NRHP-listed
- Globe Hotel (Baileys Harbor, Wisconsin), NRHP-listed
