= Globe Hotel (Baileys Harbor, Wisconsin) =

- U.S. National Register of Historic Places
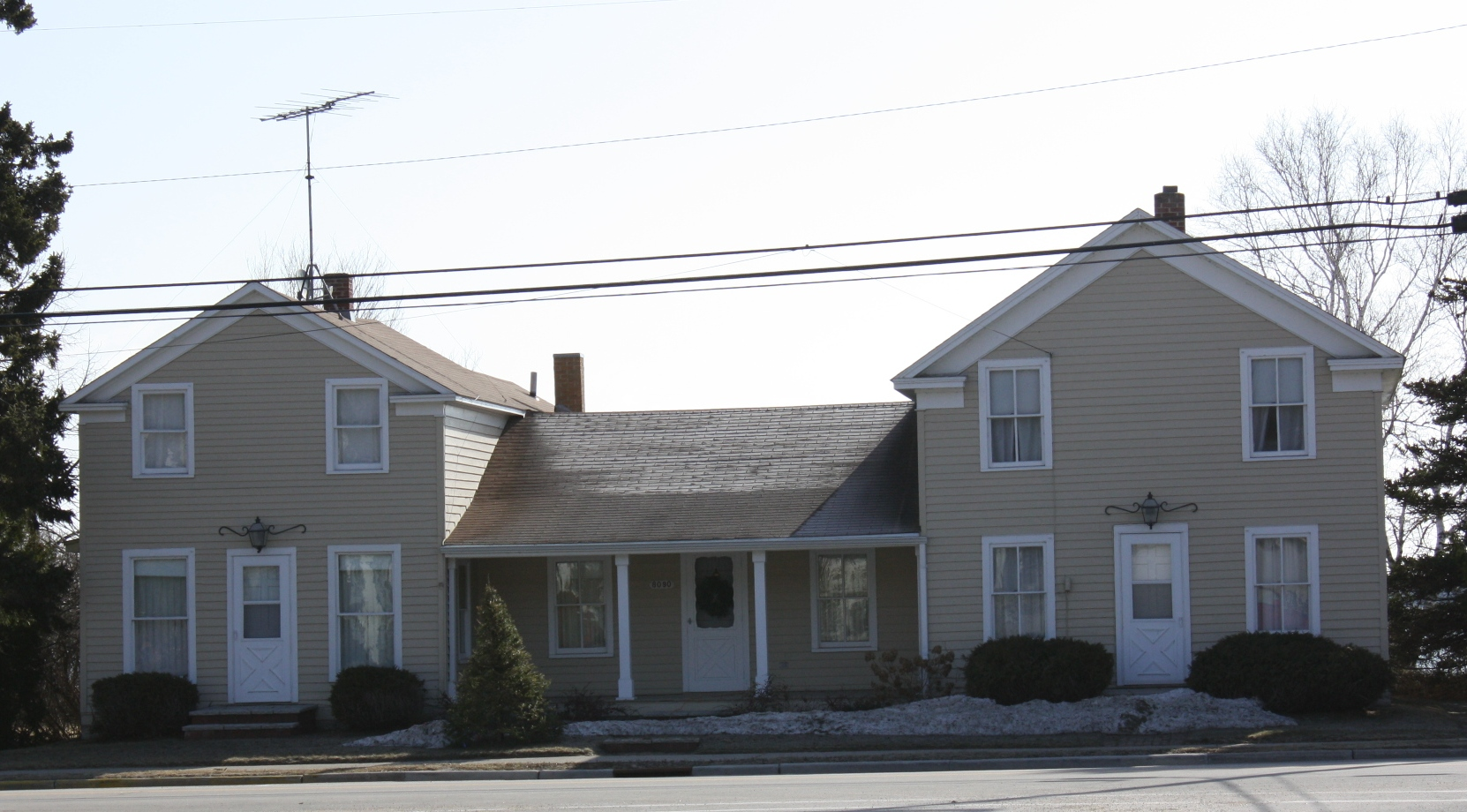
- Globe Hotel

- Location within Wisconsin Location within the United States
- Location: 8090 Main St., Baileys Harbor, Wisconsin
- Coordinates: 45°03′47″N 87°07′26″W
- Area: less than one acre
- Built: 1867
- Architectural style: Greek Revival
- NRHP reference No.: 82000663
- Added to NRHP: January 28, 1982

The Globe Hotel is located in Baileys Harbor, Wisconsin.

== History ==
The site served as a hotel from 1874 to 1886. It was operated by Roger Eatough, a local politician. The building was listed on the National Register of Historic Places in 1982 and on the State Register of Historic Places in 1989.
