= Radio Globo (Italy) =

Italian radio station

Radio Globo is an Italian popular radio station based in Rome. Despite its name, this radio station is not endorsed or affiliated with the Brazilian TV network Rede Globo.

== History ==
It was founded by Virginia Dantas as Gamma Radio in 1986, broadcasting popular mostly American and Latin hits, a format that proved very popular. After an initial period of pre-programmed music, soon the station engaged services of popular radio hosts like er Massimo Vari, Annibale Grasso, Fabio Calvari, Silvia Giansanti, Stefano Valli etc.

The station first broadcast in Rome but expanded through the Lazio region and soon had transmitters in a number of Italian cities. The station was acquired by Globo Media with CEO Bruno Benvenuti. The station's The Morning Show includes sharp humor on current topics, uses gags, parodies and characters with hosts like Maurizio Paniconi, Nandone, Massimo Vari, Gabry Venus, Alessandro Tirocchi, Andrea Torre and Roberta Coletti.

The station has also been instrumental in launching a number of novelty songs. Of notability are the 2011 Italian summer hit and the station's own version of the Romanian hit "Mr. Saxobeat". Showcasing the station staff and featuring hosts Maurizio Panicni, Alessandro Tirocchi and Morgana Giovannetti, the alternative Radio Globo Morning Show 's "Mr. Saxobeat Ostia Beach version" produced by Lucio Scarpa became popular.

Banking on that success, the station's The Morning Show came back in summer of 2012 launching an even bigger success the song "Il Pulcino Pio" featuring Morgana Giovannetti based on a Brazilian tune using sound of the character "Pulcino Pio", literally the little chirping chick that topped the Italian charts for 8 consecutive weeks.

== Frequencies ==
- Rome: 99.6 MHz
- Latina: 99.6 MHz
- Viterbo: 97.3 MHz
- Frosinone
- Rieti
