= Globe Station =

Globe Station may refer to:

- Globe station, a light rail station in Sacramento, California, USA
- Globe Hill Station, a defunct pastoral lease and cattle station in Western Australia
- Globe Ranger Station, a principal office in the Tonto National Forest in Arizona, USA
- Globe Road & Devonshire Street railway station, a demolished railway station in London, England
