= The Globe (Sydney) =

Newspaper in Sydney, Australia (1911–1914)

The Globe, front page, 12 April 1911

The Globe was a weekly English language newspaper published by Alfred Herbert Howard Aldworth in Sydney, New South Wales, Australia.

== Newspaper history ==
The Globe was first published on 5 April 1911 and continued under this masthead until 17 October 1914, which was its 185th issue. In these years it was published by Alfred Herbert Howard Aldworth for the "Sunday times" Newspaper Co. Ltd. The newspaper then became known, on 24 October 1914, as The Globe and Sunday Times War Pictorial. Hugh Donald McIntosh took over publishing. On 6 November 2016 the title reverted to The Globe until its last issue on 25 June 1917 (issue no. 328). In 1917, The Globe and Sunday Times War Pictorial merged with The Mirror of Australia to form The Mirror whose first publication was 30 June 1917.

== Digitisation ==
The Globe has been digitised as part of the Australian Newspapers Digitisation Program of the National Library of Australia.

== See also ==
- List of newspapers in Australia
- List of newspapers in New South Wales
