= Globe Derby Park =

Globe Derby Park may refer to:

- Globe Derby Park (harness racing), a trotting track in the northern part of Adelaide, South Australia
- Globe Derby Park, South Australia, the suburb of Adelaide around the trotting track and named after it
