= Go bus =

Go Bus or Gobus may refer to:

- GO Bus, the intercity and commuter bus operations of GO Transit in Southern Ontario, Canada
- Go Bus Transport, a New Zealand bus company operating in Hamilton, Hawke's Bay, Tauranga, Christchurch, Gisborne, Dunedin and Invercargill
  - Go Bus Christchurch, a bus company in New Zealand
  - GoBus, a former name for Orbus, a public transport network in Dunedin, New Zealand
- go bus, a branded version of bus rapid transit in New Jersey
- GoBus (Ohio), an intercity bus company in Ohio
- Go Buses, an intercity bus company in the United States owned by Academy Bus
- Go-Ahead Group, transport company in Newcastle which provides bus services around the UK under the brand Go Bus

== See also ==
- Globus Travel Group, a tourism coach operator
