= Globe (ship) =

Several ships have been named Globe:

- Globe (1611 ship) was an English sailing ship that was operated by the East India Company. By 1611 it had already completed 7 voyages to the East Indies.
- Globe (1809 ship) was launched at Virginia and served as a Baltimore-based privateer during the War of 1812. She captured 14 ships and had several engagements, including a three-hour action with an Algerine sloop of war.
- Globe (1810 ship) was launched at Scarborough and in 1818-1819 transported convicts to New South Wales; she was wrecked in 1824.
- Globe (1815 whaleship), of Nantucket, Massachusetts, was launched in 1815. In 1824 her crew mutinied, but eventually most of the mutineers were killed or captured, and the vessel itself returned to her owners' hands; she continued to whale until about 1828.
