= Globe Building (Minneapolis) =

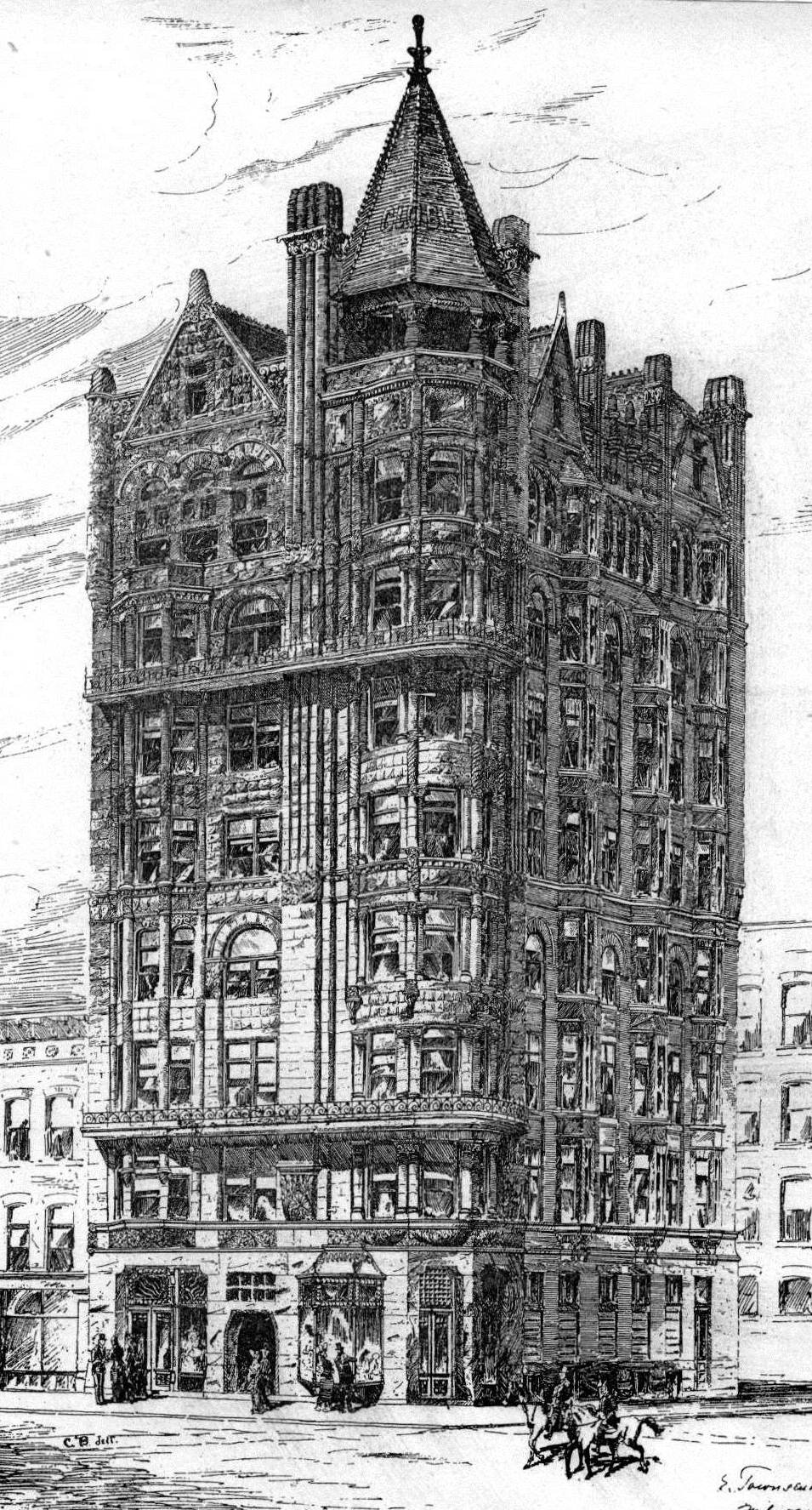
- A drawing of the Globe Building in Minneapolis, MN
- Interactive map of the Globe Building area

General information
- Status: Demolished
- Location: 20 4th Street South, Minneapolis, Minnesota
- Coordinates: 44°58′49″N 93°16′14″W
- Completed: 1889
- Destroyed: 1958

Height
- Roof: 157 ft (48 m)

Technical details
- Floor count: 8

Design and construction
- Architect: E. Townsend Mix

The Globe Building was an 8-floor building in Minneapolis. It was the first recorded tallest building in Minnesota. It was built in 1889 to house the offices of the St. Paul Globe newspaper (which occupied part of several floors) while the remainder of the building was rented as office space. Richard Warren Sears was among its early tenants.

After the newspaper folded in 1905, it continued to function as an office building and went on to count Senator Thomas Schall and Representative Ernest Lundeen among its tenants. By the 1930s the building sat vacant due to the poor economy and the general age of the building. In the 1940s it was briefly converted into a parking facility dubbed "The 4th Street Garage."

It was demolished in 1958 and replaced by the Minneapolis Central Library, which opened in 1961.
