= Globus (Macedonian magazine) =

- Editor: Branko Trichkovski (2007-2009)
- First issue: 23 April 2007
- Final issue: 2009
- Country: Macedonia (present-day North Macedonia)
- Based in: Skopje
- Language: Macedonian
- Website: globusmagazin.mk

Glbus was a weekly political magazine in Macedonia. Currently the magazine operates with online edition.
