= Solomon Globus =

Lithuanian chess player

Solomon M. Globus (born 1856 – died ?) was a Lithuanian chess master.

He took 6th at Vilna (Wilno, Vilnius) 1909 (the 6th All-Russian Masters' Tournament, Akiba Rubinstein won), and took 13th at Vilna 1912 (the 7th RUS-ch, B-tournament, Karel Hromádka won).
