= Globe Pit =

Protected area in Essex, England

Coordinates: 51.479°N 0.339°E

- Site of Special Scientific Interest
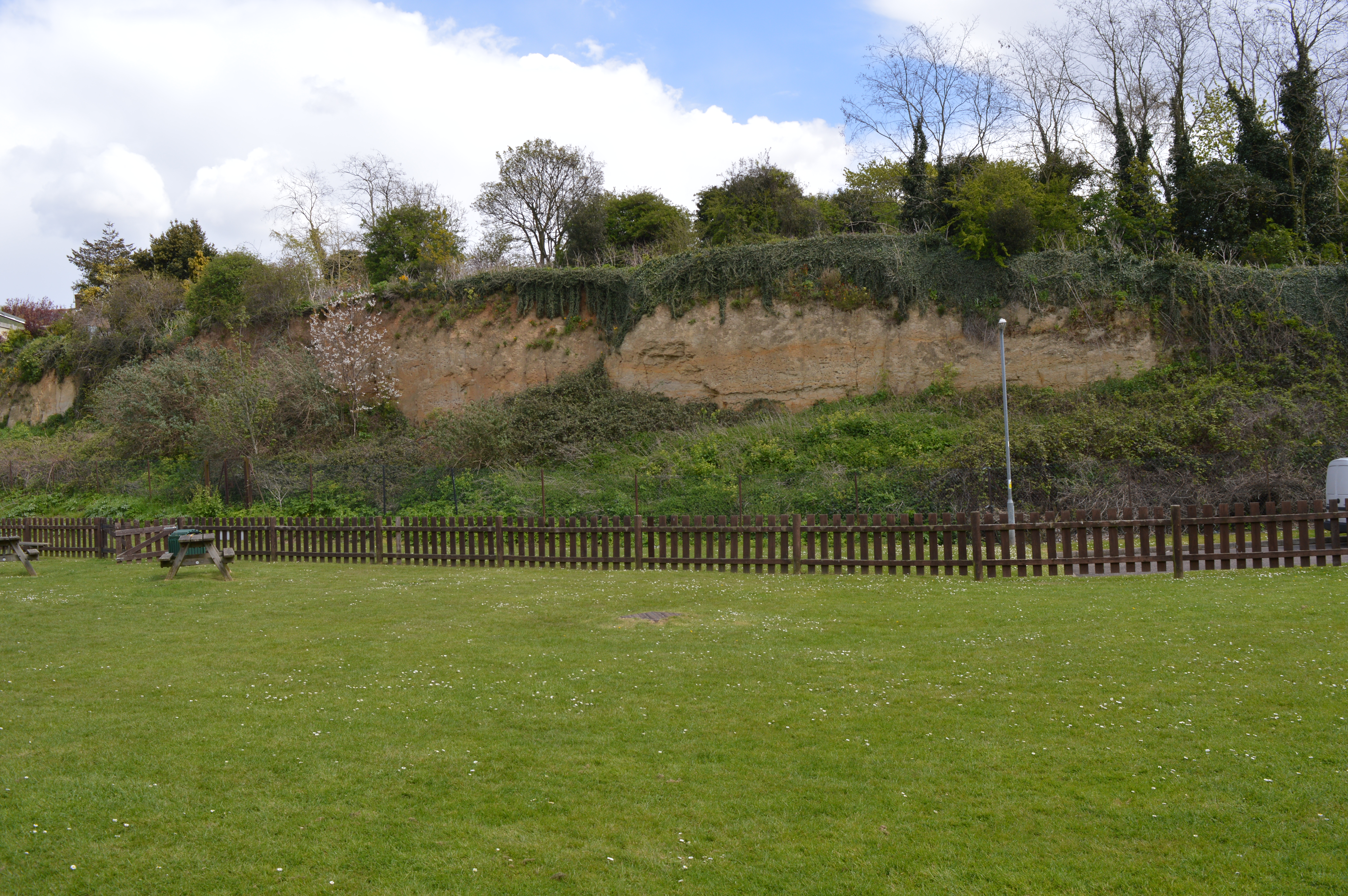
- Location of Globe Pit.
- Area of search: Essex
- Grid reference: TQ625783
- Interest: Geological
- Area: 0.4 ha (0.99 acres)
- Notification date: 1986
- Location map: Magic Map

Globe Pit is a 0.4-hectare (0.99-acre) geological Site of Special Scientific Interest in Little Thurrock in Essex. It is a Geological Conservation Review site.

Natural England describes Globe Pit as "an important site for the interrelationship of archaeology with geology since it is vital in the correlation of the Lower Palaeolithic chronology with the Pleistocene Thames Terrace sequence". Interpretation of the site is controversial, and it is therefore important for future research. There is a considerable quantity of Clactonian flint tools, dated by Paul Pettit and Mark White to MIS 10 to 9, around 350,000 years ago.

In the early 20th Century, the site was used for allotments which were recorded in two oil paintings by Francis van der Weegen in 1918 and 1928. These paintings have been described as 'rare examples of a very small number of pre-1939 depictions of English allotments'.

The site is on private land with no public access.
