= Amy Globus =

American artist, designer, and entrepreneur

- Citizenship: American
- Occupations: American artist, designer, and entrepreneur

Amy Globus is an American artist, designer, and entrepreneur. She is the co-founder and creative director of the brand design studio, Team.

Globus has exhibited her work at the Whitney Museum of American Art, The New Museum and the MIT List Visual Arts Center. Prior to co-founding Team, she developed brand identities and interactive work for Lexus, Vodafone, and Red Bull. Amy Globus serves on the boards of AIGA New York and the Rema Hort Mann Fund.

== Early life and education ==
Amy Globus was born to Marie and Rudo Steven Globus in America. She holds a Bachelor of Arts in Philosophy from Brown University, a BFA in Printmaking from the Rhode Island School of Design, and an MFA in New Genres from Columbia University in New York City.

== Career ==
Globus started her career in 2002, working for Kirshenbaum Bond & Partners (now kbs+) as a Senior Designer. In 2007, she joined Skinny (ViTRO) as Design Director/Concept Architect before moving to K&Co. in the same position.

In 2015 she co-founded her own company, Team. Her work has been featured at the Whitney Museum of American Art, The New Museum, The D'Amelio Gallery, Nevada Museum of Art, the RISD Museum in Providence, RI, the Bibliotheque Thiers, Paris, France, and at the Liverpool Biennial, United Kingdom.

In August 2005, she had a solo exhibition at the Museo Nacional Centro de Arte Reina Sofía Globus was the recipient of the Rema Hort Mann Foundation 2002 Grant alongside other artists. She has been featured in the New York Times, and Architectural Digest, and Fast Company.

Globus is also a co-founder of Team.design (often styled as Team), an American brand strategy and design studio based in Brooklyn, New York. Team was co-founded in 2015 by Amy Globus and John Clark. The firm works with global corporations, cultural institutions, and nonprofit organizations on brand identity, positioning, and experience design, with a focus on clarity, narrative, and long-term organizational coherence.

In 2021, Globus' company, Team, was listed as an honoree in Fast Company's Innovation by Design Awards. Team's rebrand for the pharmaceutical and biotechnology corporation, Pfizer, was featured in the awards' "Best Branding of 2021" category.
