= Charlière =

Gas balloon

A Charlière is the name used by contemporary 18th century French writers to refer to gas balloons. The Academy of Science commissioned Jacques Alexandre César Charles to build balloons in the summer of 1783 because the court of King Louis XVI did not want to wait that long before the Montgolfier brothers finally came from Annonay with their invention called Montgolfière. From the information that came from the environs of the Montgolfier brothers, it was not clear to Charles that the lifting gas used in Annonay was hot air. Charles, on the other hand, mistakenly suspected that the Montgolfiers would use the "inflammable air" (hydrogen) discovered by Henry Cavendish in 1766.

Charles conceived the idea that hydrogen would be a suitable lifting agent for balloons having studied the work of Robert Boyle's Boyle's Law which was published 100 years earlier in 1662, and of his contemporaries Henry Cavendish, Joseph Black and Tiberius Cavallo. Joseph Black proposed that if the gaseous element filled a balloon, the inflated object could rise up into the air, though a practical demonstration awaited a gas tight balloon material. He designed the hydrogen balloon and then worked in conjunction with the Robert brothers, Anne-Jean and Nicolas-Louis, who were skilled engineers, to build it in their workshop at the Place des Victoires in Paris. The Robert brothers invented the methodology for constructing the lightweight, airtight gas bag. They dissolved rubber in a solution of turpentine, with which they varnished stitched-together sheets of silk, to make the main envelope. They used alternating strips of red and white silk, but the discolouration of the varnishing/rubberising process left a red and yellow result.

== First hydrogen balloon ==
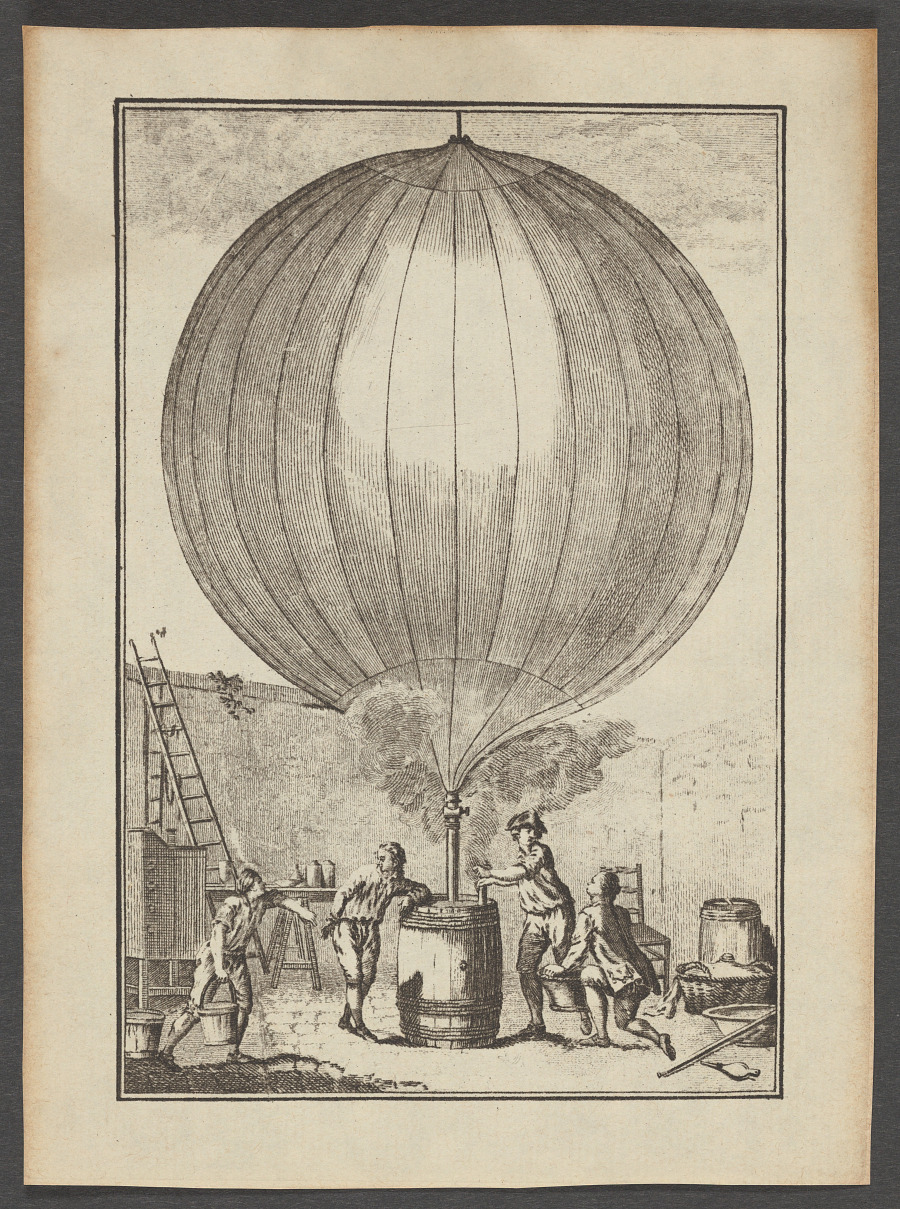
The Inflation of First Hydrogen Balloon.

Charles and the Robert brothers constructed an experimental balloon called Le Globe. This was the world's first hydrogen filled balloon. The balloon was comparatively small, a 35 cubic metre sphere (with a diameter of around 4 metres) of rubberised silk, and only capable of lifting about 9 kg (20 lb). They began filling it on 23 August 1783, in their workshop. It was filled with hydrogen that had been made by pouring nearly a quarter of a tonne of sulphuric acid onto a half a tonne of scrap iron. The hydrogen gas was fed into the envelope via lead pipes; but as it was not passed through cold water, great difficulty was experienced in filling the balloon completely (the gas was hot when produced, but as it cooled in the balloon, it contracted). Daily progress bulletins were issued on the inflation, attracting a crowd that became so great that on the 26th the balloon was moved secretly by night to the Champ de Mars (now the site of the Eiffel Tower), a distance of four kilometres.

=== Flight and landing ===
Le Globe was launched on 27 August 1783, from the Champ de Mars, where the diplomatic representative of the United States of America in France, Benjamin Franklin was among the crowd of onlookers. It carried no passengers or cargo.

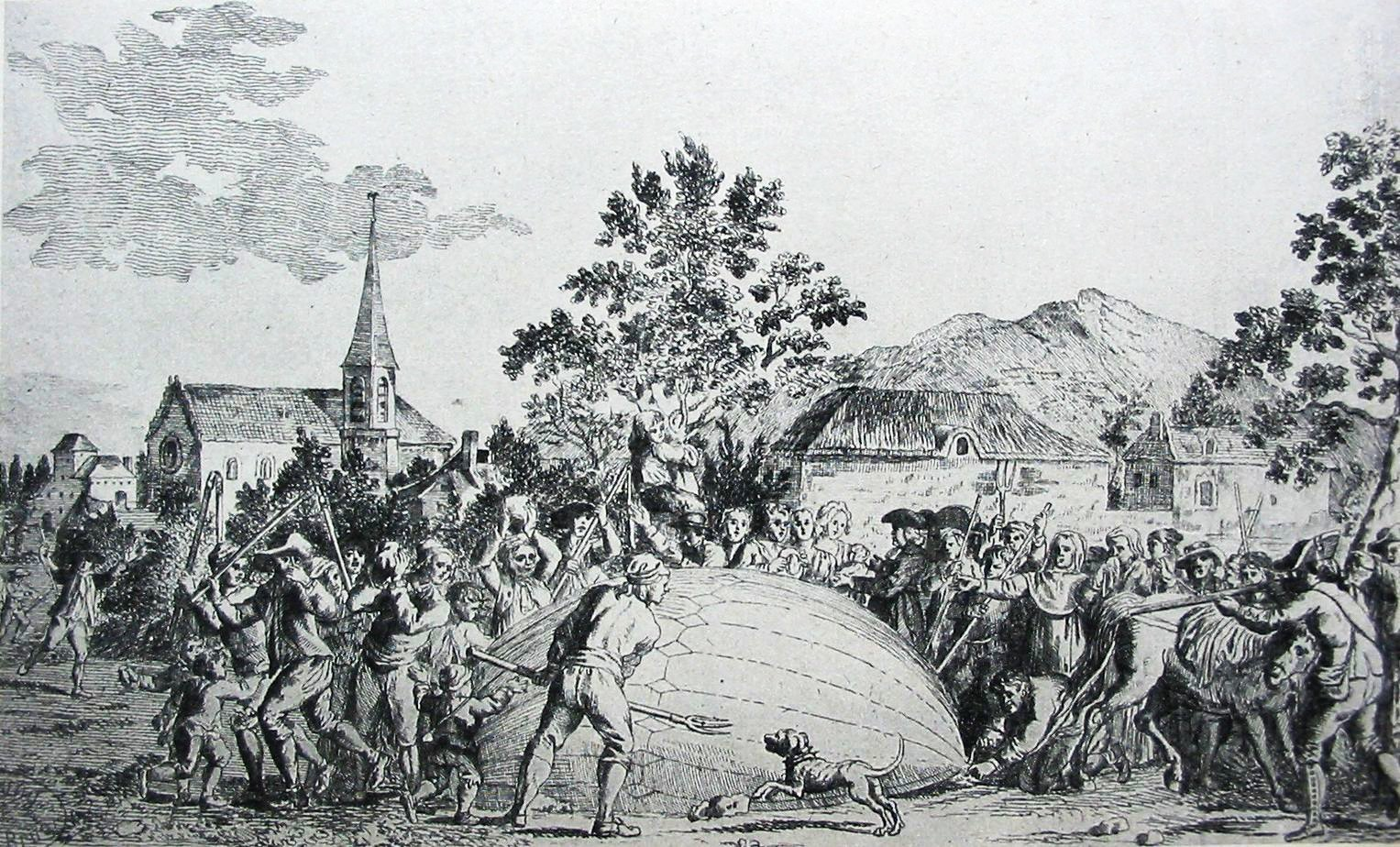
The balloon built by Jacques Charles and the Robert brothers is attacked by terrified villagers in Gonesse. Some of them even started attacking him because they weren't used to things flying.

The balloon flew northwards for 45 minutes, pursued by chasers on horseback, and landed 21 kilometres away in the village of Gonesse (not far from today's Charles de Gaulle Airport) where the reportedly terrified local peasants attacked it with pitchforks or knives and destroyed the "monster from the heavens".

The project was funded by a subscription organised by Barthélemy Faujas de Saint-Fond.

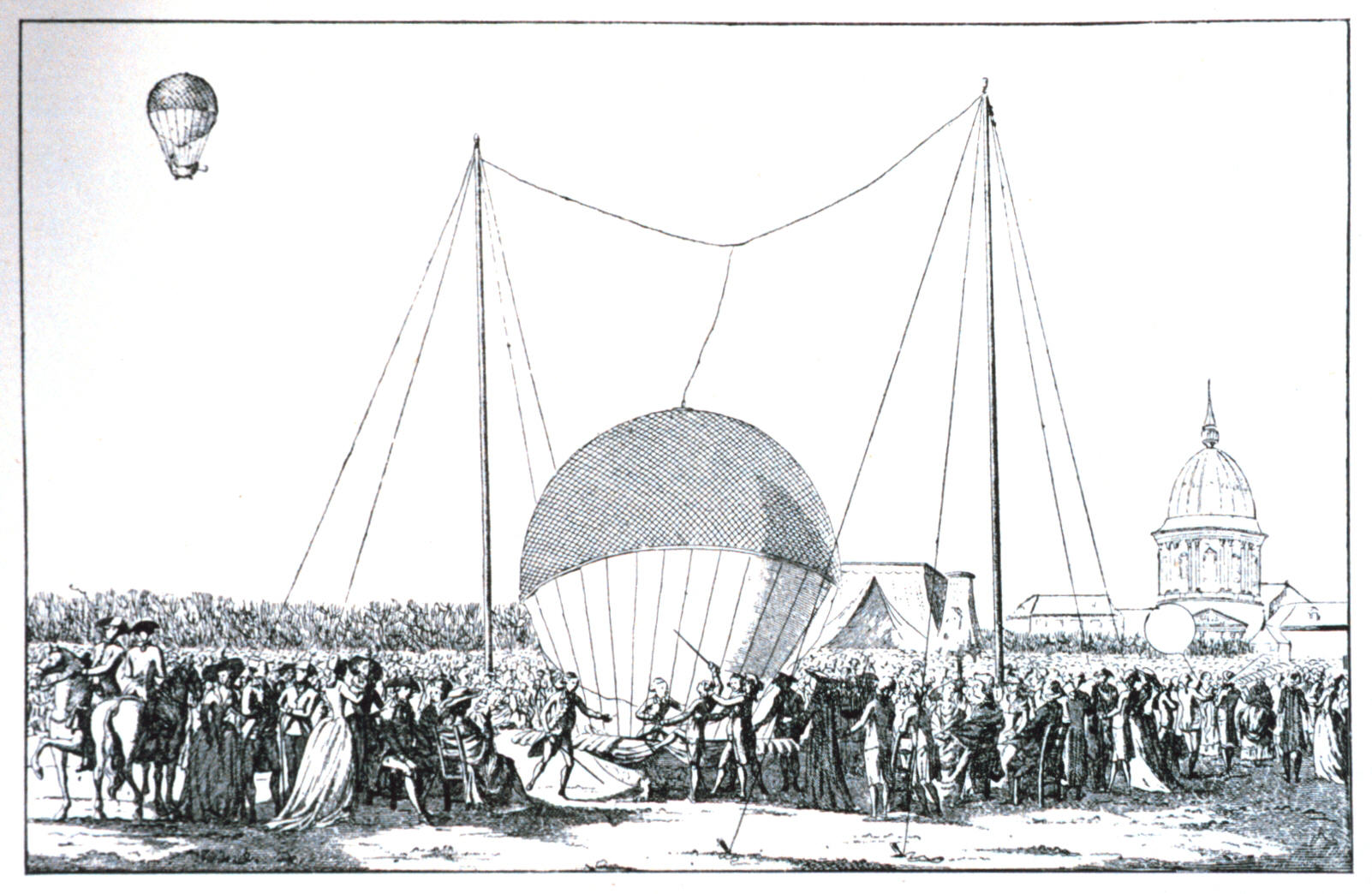

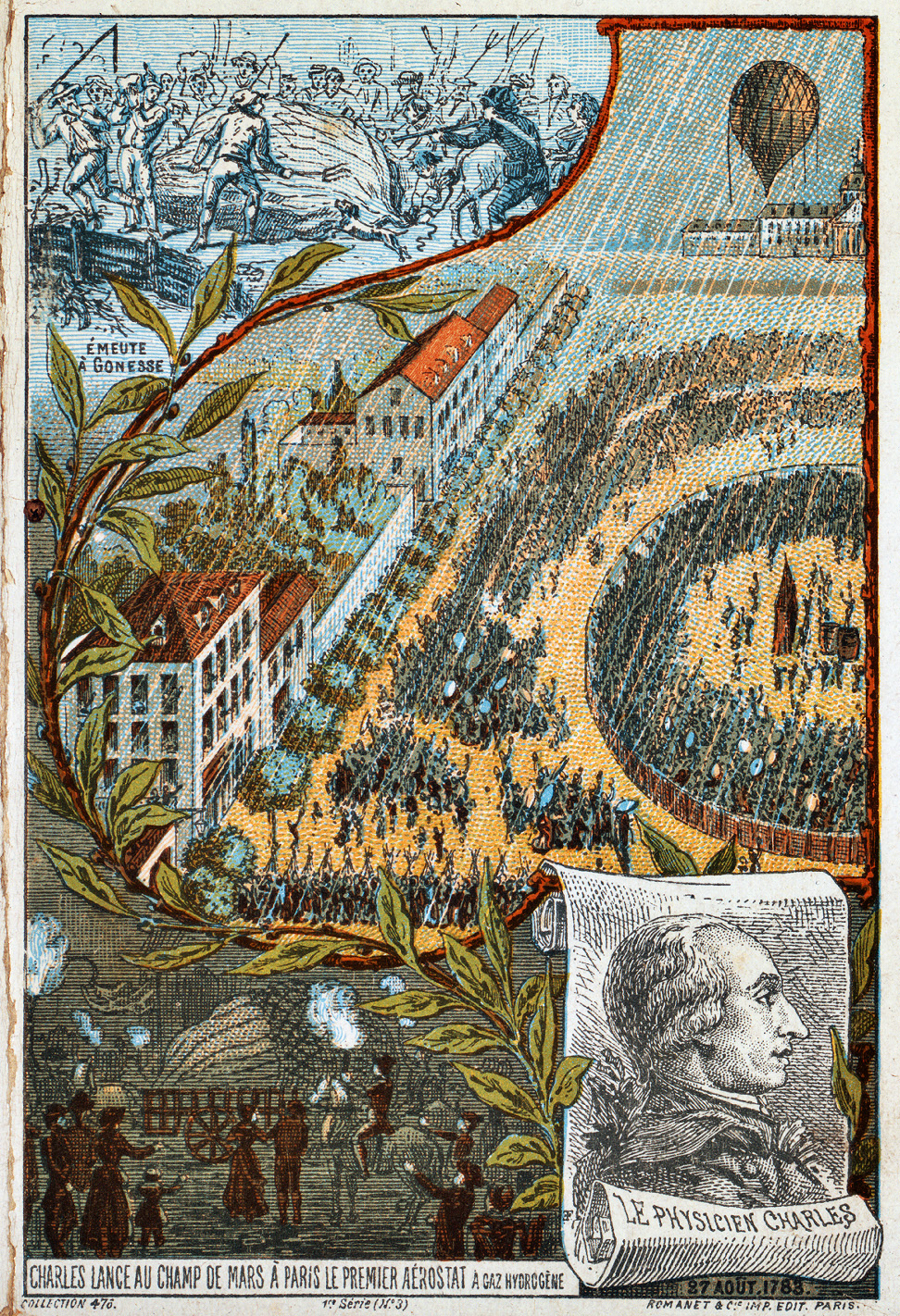

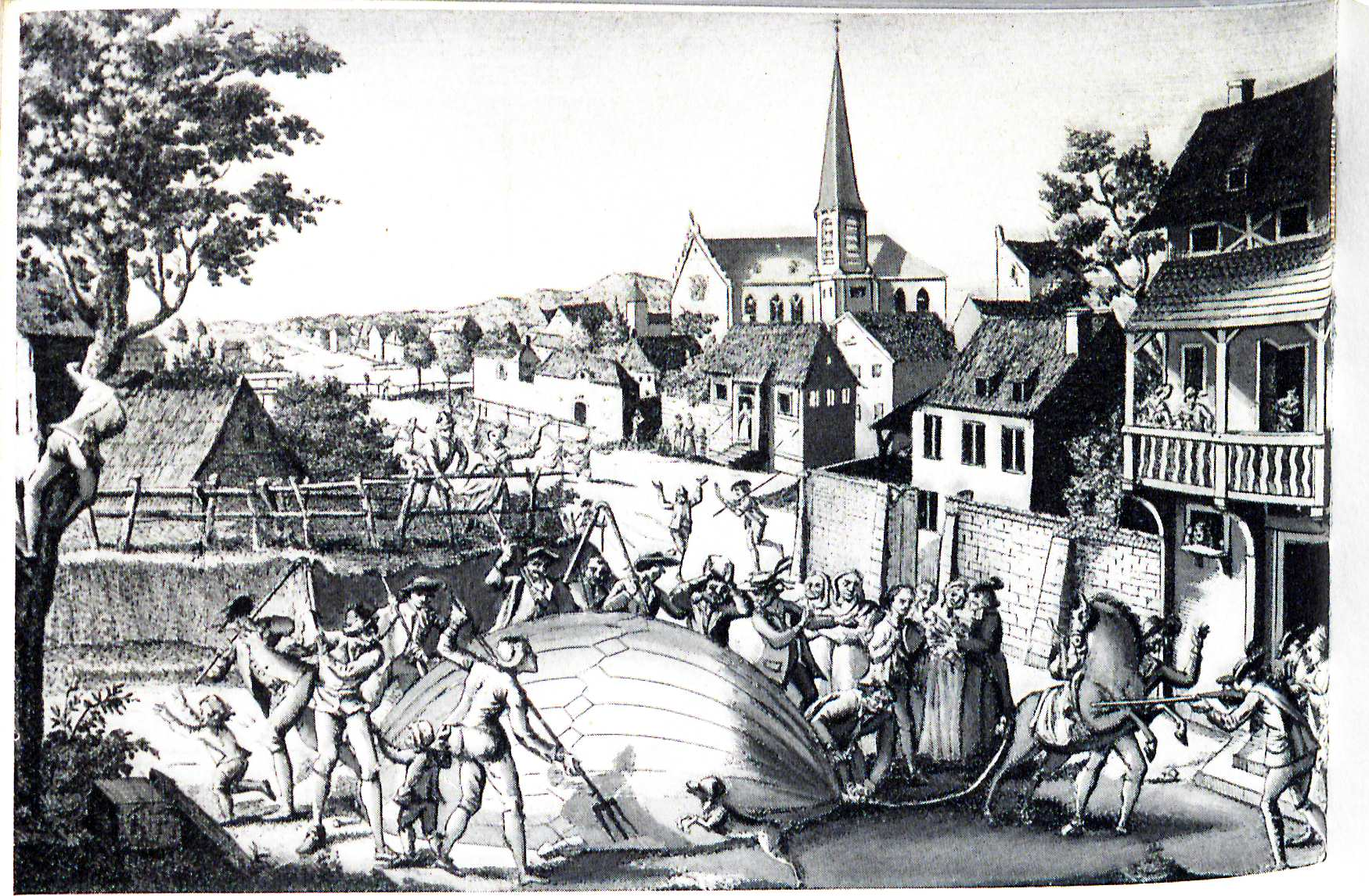

== First manned hydrogen balloon flight ==
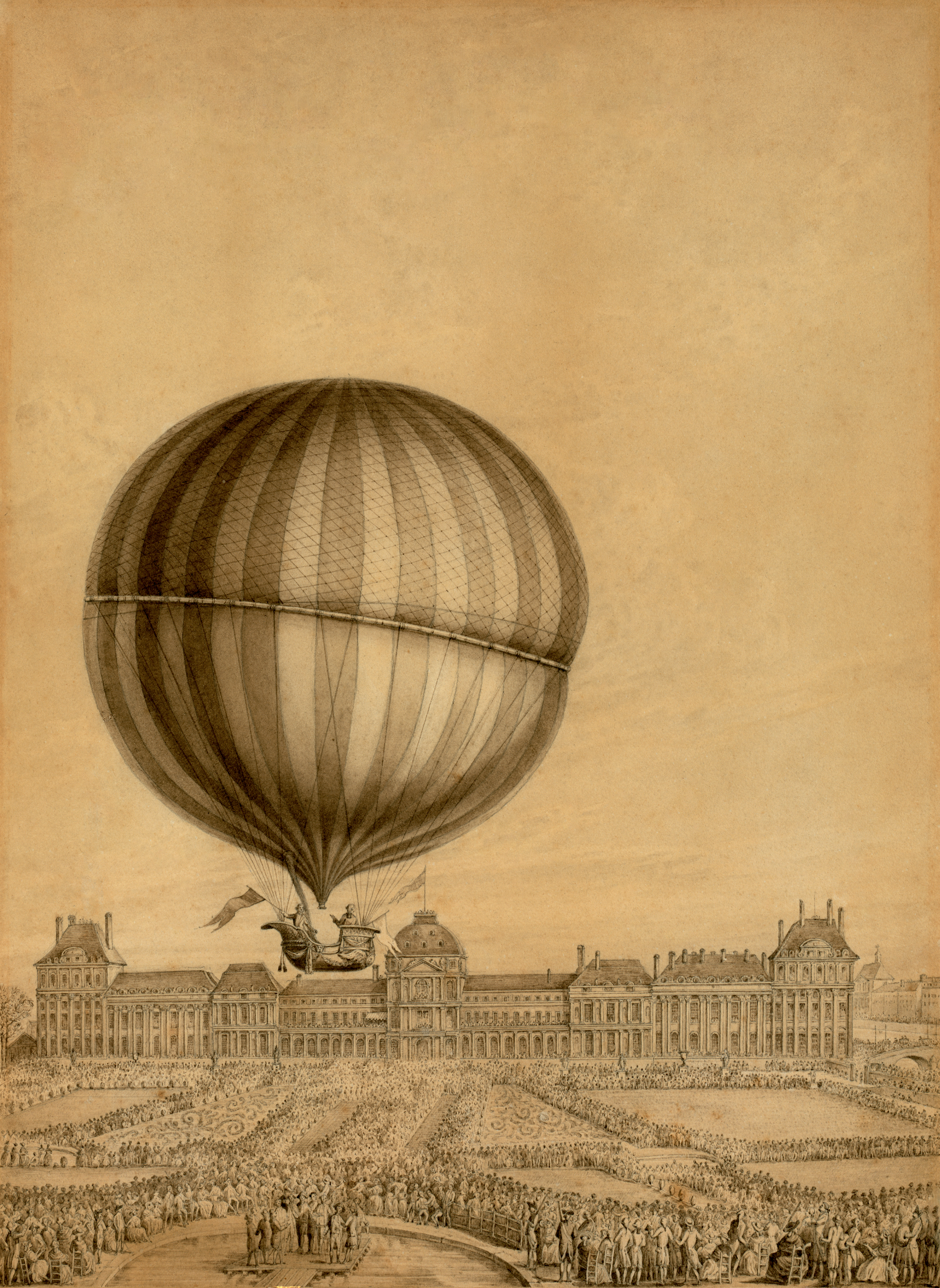
Contemporary illustration of the first flight by Charles with Nicolas-Louis Robert, launched in the Jardin des Tuileries on 1 December 1783. Viewed from the Place de la Concorde to the Tuileries Palace (destroyed in 1871)

The first manned gas balloon ride with a Charlière then took place on December 1, 1783. It is not known if this balloon was given a name. The production of the necessary hydrogen gas made of iron shavings and sulfuric acid lasted almost three days. At 13:45 (1:45 PM) on 1 December 1783, Charles and the Robert brothers launched their new crewed balloon from the Jardin des Tuileries in Paris amid vast crowds and excitement. The balloon was held on ropes and led to its final launch place by four of the leading noblemen in France, the Marechal de Richelieu, Marshal de Biron, the Bailli de Suffren, and the Duke of Chaulnes. Charles was accompanied by Nicolas-Louis Robert as co-pilot of the 380-cubic-metre, hydrogen-filled balloon. The envelope was fitted with a hydrogen release valve and was covered with a net from which the basket was suspended. Sand ballast was used to control altitude.

It is reported that 400,000 spectators witnessed the launch, and that hundreds had paid one crown each to help finance the construction and receive access to a "special enclosure" for a "close-up view" of the take-off. Among the "special enclosure" crowd was Benjamin Franklin (when someone asked him what purpose of this new invention had, he replied with the counter question: "What Is The Good of a Newborn Baby?"). Also present was Joseph Montgolfier, whom Charles honoured by asking him to release the small, bright green, pilot balloon to assess the wind and weather conditions.

This event took place only ten days after the world's first manned balloon flight by Jean-François Pilâtre de Rozier using a Montgolfier brothers hot air balloon. Simon Schama wrote in Citizens:

Montgolfier's principal scientific collaborator was M. Charles, ... who had been the first to propose the gas produced by vitriol instead of the burning, dampened straw and wood that he had used in earlier flights. Charles himself was also eager to ascend but had run into a firm veto from the King, who from the earliest reports had been observing the progress of the flights with keen attentiveness. Anxious about the perils of a maiden flight, the King had then proposed that two criminals be sent up in a basket, at which Charles and his colleagues became indignant.

=== First flight ===
They carried a barometer and a thermometer to measure the pressure and the temperature of the air, making this not only the first manned hydrogen balloon flight but also the first balloon flight to provide meteorological measurements of the atmosphere above the Earth's surface. They ascended to a height of about 1,800 feet (550 m) and landed at sunset in Nesles-la-Vallée after a 2-hour, 5-minute flight covering 36 km. The chasers on horseback, who were led by the Duc de Chartres, held down the craft while both Charles and Nicolas-Louis alighted.

=== Second flight ===
Charles then decided to ascend again, but alone this time because the balloon had lost some of its hydrogen. This time it ascended rapidly to an altitude of about 3,000 metres, rising into the sunlight again, so that Charles then saw a second sunset. He began suffering from aching pain in his ears so he 'valved' to release gas, and descended to land gently about 3 km away at Tour du Lay. And so, the first solo flight with a balloon was made with a Charlière. Unlike the Robert brothers, Charles never flew again, although a hydrogen balloon came to be called a Charlière in his honour.

First flight of a gas air balloon on 1 December 1783

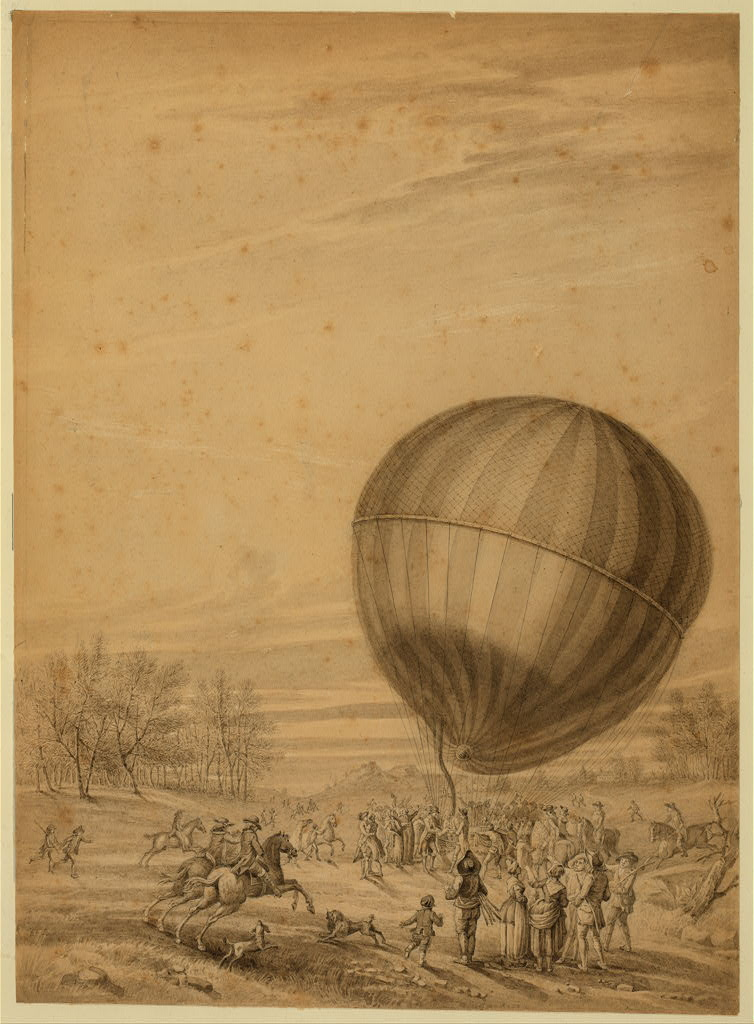
The Charlière after landing

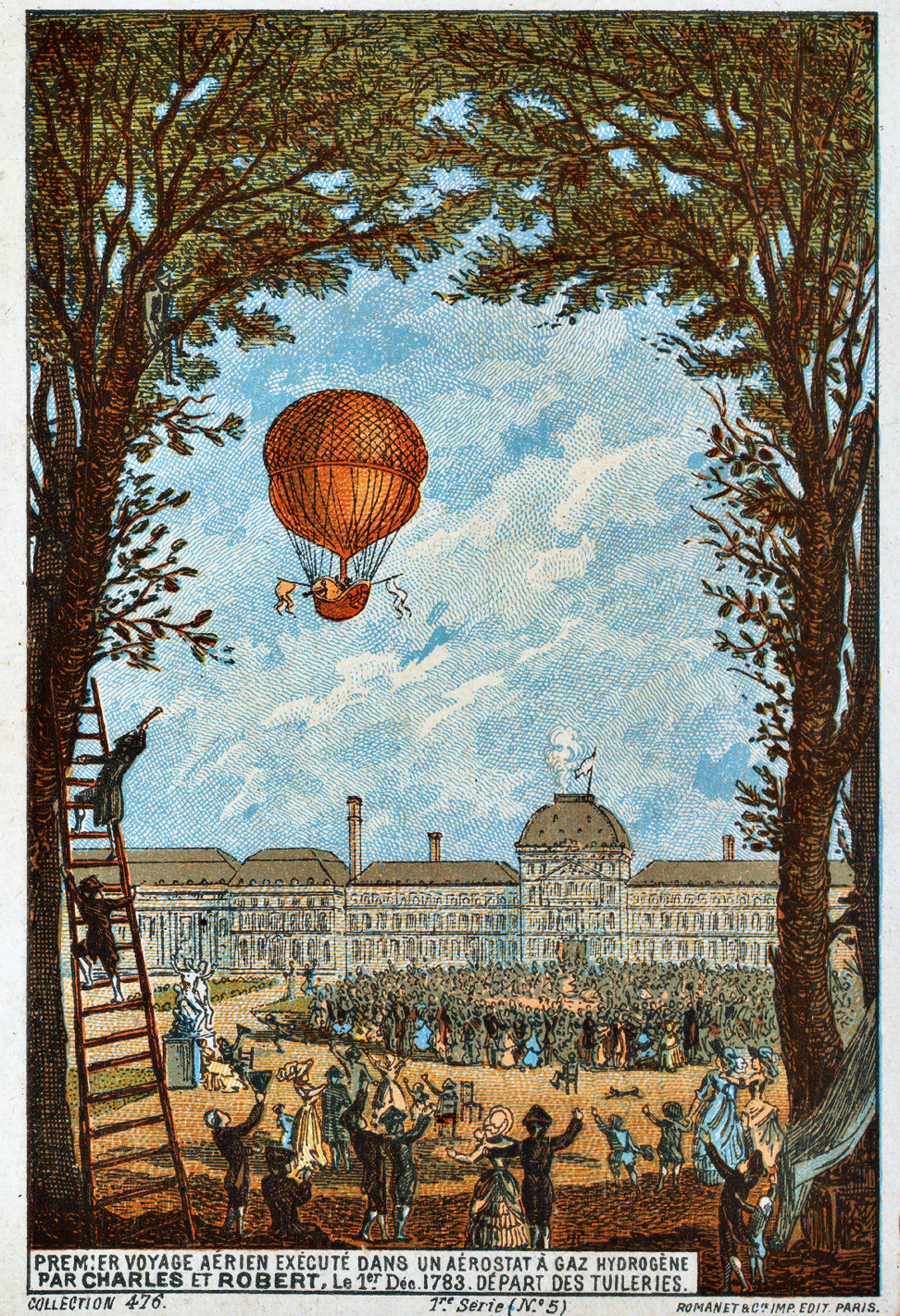
The first ride of the Charlière collecting card
