= The Globe (Camp Lejeune) =

- Type: Weekly newspaper
- Publisher: Fayetteville Publishing
- Managing editor: Pat Gruner
- Staff writers: Calvin Shomaker, Sports Writer. Shelly Fierro, Graphic Designer.
- Founded: 1944
- Language: English
- Ceased publication: September 3, 2020
- Headquarters: Jacksonville, North Carolina
- Circulation: 30,000
- OCLC number: 10703891
- Website: camplejeuneglobe.com

The Globe was a weekly newspaper published for the Marine Corps Base Camp Lejeune - (pronounced LUH JERN by some) community. In addition to its military staff and correspondents, The Globe carries a civilian bureau, employed by Fayetteville Publishing.

The Globe has been the official publication of Marine Corps Base Camp Lejeune since Feb. 23, 1944, when Maj. Gen. Henry Louis Larsen, commanding officer, saw the need for a larger newspaper to replace The New River Pioneer. The mission of The Globe is to provide robust support to the base and its tenant commands. The Globe is published on a weekly basis and keeps the Marines, sailors, and the surrounding community in touch with what's happening on base and what the Corps is accomplishing locally and worldwide.

The Globe newspaper is the official DOD publication that supports MCB Camp Lejeune, MCAS New River and MCAS Cherry Point with a combined economic impact of $6.12 billion.

The Globe published its final paper on September 3, 2020.

== Awards ==
The staff has received four Thomas Jefferson Awards for Journalistic Excellence, three USMC Division of Public Affairs Awards, a USMC Combat Correspondents Association Merit Award and was named "Best Newspaper in the Marine Corps" in 2004 and 2008. The camp Lejeune Globe was awarded the Thomas Jefferson Award in 1975 and 2013 for Best Newspaper in the Armed Forces.
