= Globo =

Globo (meaning globe in Portuguese, Spanish and Italian) may refer to:

- Grupo Globo, a Brazilian conglomerate primarily in mass media
  - Globo, a subsidiary that operate television and digital services
    - TV Globo, a television network
      - GloboNews, a television 24-hour news channel
      - Globo (Portuguese TV channel)
    - Canais Globo, a satellite TV service; also in Portugal
    - Globo Filmes, a movie production company
  - O Globo, a newspaper
  - Editora Globo, a publishing house
- Globo Futebol Clube, a Brazilian football club
- Il Globo, an Italian-language newspaper published in Australia
- Radio Globo (Honduras), a radio station

== See also ==
- Glovo (pronounced identically in Spanish), a multinational delivery company headquartered in Spain
