= Globe Theatre (disambiguation) =

The Globe Theatre was a theatre in London associated with William Shakespeare.

Globe Theatre may also refer to:

- Globe Theatre, Regina in Regina, Saskatchewan, Canada
- Globe Theatre, Dunedin, New Zealand
- Globe Theatre (Newcastle Street) (1868–1902), London, UK
- Gielgud Theatre was known as the Globe Theatre from 1909 to 1994, Shaftesbury Avenue, London, UK
- Shakespeare's Globe, London, UK
- Old Globe Theatre of San Diego, California, U.S.
- Globe Theatre, California, U.S., part of Universal Studios Hollywood
- Globe Theatre, Los Angeles, California, U.S.
- Globe Theatre, Boston (1871), Massachusetts, U.S.
- Globe Theatre, Boston (1903), Massachusetts, U.S.
- Lunt-Fontanne Theatre or Globe Theatre, New York, U.S.
- New Theatre Comique, former theater in New York City
- Pop-up Globe, a theatre company that performed Shakespeare plays in a temporary, full-scale touring replica of the Globe Theatre

== See also ==
- Globe of the Great Southwest, Odessa, Texas
