= WYDE =

WYDE or wyde may refer to:

- WYDE (AM), a radio station (1260 AM) licensed to serve Birmingham, Alabama, United States
- WYDE-FM, a radio station (92.5 FM) licensed to serve Cordova, Alabama
- WXJC (AM), a radio station (850 AM) licensed to serve Birmingham, Alabama, which held the call sign WYDE from 1957 to 1998 and from 1999 to 2002
- WXJC-FM, a radio station (101.1 FM) licensed to serve Cullman, Alabama, which held the call sign WYDE-FM from 2002 to 2018
- wyde (unit), a proposed unit of information by Donald Knuth denoting 16 bit
