= WXJC =

WXJC may refer to:

- WXJC (AM), a radio station (850 AM) licensed to serve Birmingham, Alabama, United States
- WXJC-FM, a radio station (101.1 FM) licensed to serve Cullman, Alabama
- WYDE-FM, a radio station (92.5 FM) licensed to serve Cordova, Alabama, which held the call sign WXJC-FM from 2004 to 2006 and from 2007 to 2018
