= WMUZ =

WMUZ may refer to:

- WMUZ (AM), a radio station (1200 AM) licensed to serve Taylor, Michigan, United States
- WMUZ-FM, a radio station (103.5 FM) licensed to serve Detroit, Michigan
