= WYBN =

WYBN may refer to:

- WYBN-LD, a low-power television station (channel 26, virtual 14) licensed to serve Cobleskill, New York, United States
- WLBY, a radio station (1290 AM) licensed to serve Saline, Michigan, United States, which held the call sign WYBN from 1999 to 2001
