= WPWX =

Urban contemporary radio station in Hammond, Indiana, United States

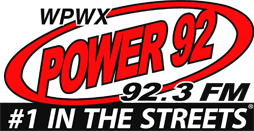
- Hammond, Indiana; United States
- Broadcast area: Chicago metropolitan area Northwest Indiana
- Frequency: 92.3 MHz (HD Radio)
- Branding: Power 92

Programming
- Format: Urban contemporary
- Subchannels: HD2: WYCA simulcast (Urban contemporary gospel)
- Affiliations: Compass Media Networks

Ownership
- Owner: Crawford Broadcasting; (Dontron Inc.)
- Sister stations: WSRB, WYCA

History
- First air date: 1949
- Former call signs: WJIZ (1949–1954); WJOB-FM (1954–1959); WYCA (1959-2001); WVJM (2001)
- Call sign meaning: Po Wer X

Technical information
- Licensing authority: FCC
- Facility ID: 17304
- Class: B
- ERP: 50,000 watts
- HAAT: 150 meters (490 ft)
- Transmitter coordinates: 41°37′50.00″N 87°31′40.00″W

Links
- Public license information: Public file; LMS
- Webcast: Listen Live
- Website: power92chicago.com

WPWX (92.3 FM) is an urban contemporary radio station licensed to Hammond, Indiana and serving the Chicago metropolitan area in addition to Northwest Indiana, and is owned by Crawford Broadcasting. The station broadcasts from a transmitter a few hundred feet west of the Illinois/Indiana state line in Burnham, Illinois, with studios on Calumet Avenue in Hammond.

== History ==
The station began broadcasting in 1949, and held the call sign WJIZ. The station was owned by South Shore Broadcasting Company. In 1954, the station's call sign was changed to WJOB-FM, and the station simulcast the programming of its sister station WJOB 1230. In 1959, the station was sold to Percy Crawford for $119,000. The station's call sign was changed to WYCA, standing for "Young People's Church of the Air", and the station began airing a Christian format.

The station switched to an urban contemporary format on March 26, 2001, in an attempt to go head to head with the longtime urban radio leader in Chicago, WGCI-FM. The station's call sign was briefly changed to WVJM in April 2001, before being changed to WPWX on May 1, 2001. WPWX currently is the Chicago home to The Rickey Smiley Morning Show, and at one time carried both the Doug Banks Morning Show and The Tom Joyner Morning Show.

== HD Programming ==
All Crawford Broadcasting Company radio stations broadcast in digital HD Radio, and all Crawford FMs also broadcast both HD1 & HD2 (digital) audio. Urban Gospel sister station WYCA, known as Rejoice 102.3, is simulcast on WPWX-HD2.
