= John Records Landecker =

American disk jockey (born 1947)

- Born: March 28, 1947 (age 79); Michigan, United States
- Other name: John Landecker
- Children: 2, including Amy Landecker
- Presenting career
- Stations: WLS Chicago (1972–1981, 1986-1989); CFTR Toronto (1981–1983); WLUP Chicago (1983); WAGO/WCKG Chicago (1984–1986); WENZ Cleveland (1989–1993); WJMK-FM Chicago (1993–2003); WZZN Chicago (2006–2007); WGN Chicago (2020–present) Pre-WLS: WOIA-FM, WOIB Ann Arbor; WERX Grand Rapids; WILS Lansing; WIBG Philadelphia
- Country: United States

John Records Landecker (born March 28, 1947) is an American Top 40/oldies disc jockey with a trademark saying "Records truly is my middle name" who created Boogie Check, Americana Panorama, and satirical songs and bits based on current events such as "Make a Date with the Watergate", and "Press My Conference". He first retired from radio broadcasting on July 31, 2015. Boogie Check was the last humorous feature Landecker did each night on his show for about two minutes. A string of brief telephone calls was put on the air in rapid succession. From July 2007 through June 2012, he hosted "Into the Seventies", a syndicated weekend radio program from TKO Radio Networks.

Landecker returned to Chicago radio on September 28, 2020, joining WGN (AM) as the 7–10 p.m. weeknight evening host.

== Early life and education ==
Landecker was born in Michigan. His father, Werner Landecker, was a German-Jewish refugee. His mother, Marjorie Records, was a "farm girl from Indiana". His middle name, the source of questions throughout his career, was not, as most assumed, a stage name. His mother's maiden name was Records (her full name was Marjorie Victoria Records as Landecker himself told during the 2008 BIG89 Rewind on 890 WLS AM) and was given to him at birth. "Records truly is my middle name" is a saying Landecker frequently used on the air. Landecker began his radio career while in high school at a station in Ann Arbor, Michigan (WOIA-FM/WOIB). He began his college career at Grand Valley State University and worked for Grand Rapids station WERX. He later attended Michigan State University, working at stations in Lansing (WILS) and Philadelphia (WIBG) before becoming the evening jock on the 50,000-watt WLS 890 which broadcast from Chicago, Illinois in 1972. The powerful WLS clear channel signal reached across 38 states after sundown, giving Landecker ratings that are unheard of today.

== Career ==
In 1981 Landecker left Chicago for a stint on CFTR 680 in Toronto, Ontario. Landecker returned to Chicago radio in 1983 on rocker WLUP 97.9 and the following year joined top 40 WAGO 105.9. Landecker remained on 105.9 after it switched to AOR as WCKG in 1985, but left the station to return to WLS in 1986. He remained at WLS until it switched to an all-talk format in 1989.

After spending time in Cleveland at WPHR, 107.9, he returned to Chicago in early September 1993, beginning a ten-year run on Oldies 104.3 WJMK where he was the morning drive D.J. until 2003. While on WJMK, his show received the Achievement in Radio award of "Best Morning Show in Chicago" in 1997, and Radio and Records Award of "Best Oldies Morning Show in America" in 2001 and 2002. In 2006 Landecker started on True Oldies 94.7 WZZN in Chicago where he was the weekday afternoon D.J. from 3-7pm until October 10, 2007. Landecker co-hosted a radio news show with former WLS colleague Turi Ryder.

During his time in Toronto, Landecker did a funny two-minute bit called 'Trudeau Talks Cute' in which he would ask set-up questions that would be followed by a tape recording of Canada's then-Prime Minister, the very popular Pierre Trudeau. The initialism of 'Trudeau Talks Cute' was TTC, which was also used to play up the often-unpopular Toronto Transit Commission. When at WILS Radio (Lansing, MI), Landecker would intro his show using a megaphone to simulate an old-time barker's voice. Called the "Radio Leviathan", Landecker talked over openings in the Beatles' "Sgt. Pepper's Lonely Hearts Club Band". While doing the morning show at WJMK, he would start the "5:30 club" by having co-host Richard Cantu begin his normal newscast, then interrupt him by saying "This is Anarchy! This is Rebellion!" and stating he was tearing up the list of scheduled songs and would play listener's requests instead. He abandoned this feature soon after 9/11.

Starting on January 23, 2012, Landecker was heard from 8:00 pm to 11:00 pm (CT) Monday through Friday and Saturday 7:00 to 11:00 pm on 94.7 WLS-FM in Chicago. Landecker ended his tenure at WLS-FM on July 31, 2015. The show was streamed live, in parts, on Periscope by his producer, Tony Lossano. His longtime friend and fellow DJ, Dick Biondi, (whose time slot followed Landecker on WLS-FM) stopped by during the show to say goodbye.

In the summer of 2020 Landecker sent an email to WGN Radio management suggesting he fill in for morning host Bob Sirott. He was immediately offered nights 7p–10p Mon–Thur.

== Personal life ==
His daughters are writer Tracy Landecker and actress Amy Landecker. His autobiography is titled Records Truly Is My Middle Name.

== Awards and honors ==
Landecker was elected to the National Radio Hall of Fame in 2017 and the National Association of Broadcasters Hall of Fame in 2020.

Landecker was inducted into the Illinois Rock and Roll Hall of Fame on June 6, 2022. He is part of the second class of inductees and the second DJ inducted, following Larry Lujack in 2021.
