= KBRT =

Christian radio station in Costa Mesa, California, United States

- Costa Mesa, California; United States
- Broadcast area: Southern California
- Frequency: 740 kHz (HD Radio)
- Branding: K-BRITE

Programming
- Format: Christian talk and teaching

Ownership
- Owner: Crawford Media Group; (Kiertron, Inc.)

History
- First air date: June 1, 1952
- Former call signs: KBIG (1952–1979)

Technical information
- Licensing authority: FCC
- Facility ID: 34588
- Class: D
- Power: 50,000 watts (day); 190 watts (night)
- Transmitter coordinates: 33°49′44.1″N 117°38′21.2″W
- Translator: 100.7 K274CI (Corona)
- Repeater: 1240 KNSN (San Diego)

Links
- Public license information: Public file; LMS
- Webcast: Listen live
- Website: www.kbriteradio.com

KBRT (740 AM; K-BRITE) is a commercial radio station licensed to Costa Mesa, California, United States, and serves Los Angeles and Orange counties and can be heard in The Inland Empire and north San Diego County. It airs a Christian talk and teaching format and is owned by Crawford Media Group. Studios and business offices are located on Airway Avenue in Costa Mesa, and the transmitter is on Black Star Canyon Road in the Santa Ana Mountains.

KBRT is licensed by the Federal Communications Commission to broadcast in the HD Radio hybrid format. Programming is also heard on 13-watt FM translator K274CI at 100.7 MHz in Corona, as well as KNSN (1240 AM) in San Diego.

== History ==
=== Early years ===
The station signed on the air on June 1, 1952. It was a daytimer station, powered at 10,000 watts during the day but required to go off the air at night. The station was founded by entrepreneur John H. Poole as KBIG. Poole had worked at KEZY in Anaheim, and was founder of KBIC-TV in Los Angeles. Later, he would own KBIG-FM. Studios were located at the transmitter site in Avalon on Santa Catalina Island. But because it required a boat ride to get to and from the site, the studios were later relocated to the mainland coast.

From the beginning, there were contentious disagreements with co-channel KCBS in San Francisco over interference between the stations. Much of the path between stations' transmitters was over highly conductive seawater.

According to the July 28, 1979, issue of Billboard Magazine, Bonneville Communications owned KBRT prior to the sale to Crawford Media Group. Bonneville, owned by the Church of Jesus Christ of Latter-day Saints (LDS), has dabbled on and off in the Los Angeles radio market and also once owned KSWD, "The Sound" at 100.3 FM. After changing call signs from KBIG, KBRT was a mixture of secular and Christian music, with all programming taped, and all song "intros and outros" recorded by professional announcers. There was no live, "on-air" talent until after changing over to a completely Christian radio format.

=== 1980s and 90s ===
In 1980, the station switched to a Christian talk and teaching format after being purchased by Donald Crawford of Crawford Media Group. Upon the death of Percy Crawford in the late 1950s, the company's founder, the assets of the original Crawford Media Group were split up among his heirs. Just prior to the switch, KBRT played contemporary Christian music from sunrise to sunset. The daily sign-on began with a recording of a man's voice: "Good morning. This is K-B-R-T Avalon, and we now begin another day of broadcasting over Southern California. K-B-R-T radio broadcasts on an assigned frequency of 740 kilohertz with a power output of 10,000 watts by authority of the Federal Communications Commission. K-B-R-T's transmitter was located on Santa Catalina Island and is operated by Kiertron, Incorporated." Disc jockeys made multiple mentions of "Transmitter Tom", who lived on Catalina Island, and oversaw the station's transmitter.

On-air personalities over the decades have included Rich Buhler, Paul McGuire, Jane Chastain, Greg Koukl, Greg Cynamon, Rich Agazino, Paul McGuire, Tim Berends, Al Gross, Helen Fabian, and Roger Marsh.

=== 2000s ===
Contractors cutting a steel antenna cable with a gas-powered circular saw caused a wildfire on Catalina Island that began on May 10, 2007. KBRT had to shut down the transmitter, which was not damaged. In February 2013, KBRT moved to a new transmitter site no longer on Catalina Island, instead near Corona, California. It began broadcasting at 50,000 watts, still sunrise to sunset, added nighttime authorization at 190 watts and had its city of license changed to Costa Mesa. In 2011, KBRT featured David Housholder, Orange County author and pastor, and Roger Marsh in the 3pm-5pm drive-home slot, with "The Bottom Line", a current events show with features in legal, educational, health, and finance segments. Housholder exited "The Bottom Line" in April 2013. "The Bottom Line" reaches most AM radios in California, since it is syndicated on KCBC in the Sacramento/Bay Area region. A few years later Housholder left the station and Marsh hosted the program alone for over a decade until August 2024 when he left to work full time for the ministry Family Talk with James Dobson.
