= Crawford Broadcasting =

American media company

Crawford Media Group is a family-owned media company based in Denver, Colorado. Crawford Media Group primarily owns radio stations with Christian, Talk radio and Urban formats.

== History ==
The broadcast company was founded in 1959 by evangelist Dr. Percy B. Crawford. In 1949 Crawford produced his first Christian television broadcast, which aired on the fledgling ABC Television Network.

In 1958, Crawford put together a business plan for the acquisition of seven radio stations. By 1960 seven stations were acquired. These radio stations were in Miami, Florida (WMFP)^{1}; Buffalo, New York (WDCX); Des Moines, Iowa (KDMI)^{2}; Portland, Oregon (KPDQ)^{3}; Chicago, Illinois (WJIZ); Lancaster, Pennsylvania (WDAC) and Detroit, Michigan (WMUZ) were either purchased or had construction permits issued by the FCC. That same year, 1960, Dr. Crawford died and family business was transferred to the leadership of his wife, Ruth Crawford Porter and his son Donald B. Crawford. Between 1968 and 1979 the company expanded by acquiring stations in Birmingham, Alabama (WDJC-FM); Dallas, Texas (KAAM, operated under call letters KPBC at AM1040 but later moved to AM770); and Oklahoma (since divested). In 1980, Media Group purchased a radio station in Los Angeles (KBRT) to further expand its portfolio, and the company launched a further expansion of its station base in 1991.

=== Notes ===
^{1}Station now owned by Clear Channel Communications.
^{2}Station now owned by Cumulus Media.
^{3}Station now owned by Salem Communications.

== Markets with Crawford-owned stations ==
Birmingham, Alabama

- WDJC-FM - 93.7 - Contemporary Christian
- WXJC - 850 - Christian Talk/Programs
- WXJC-FM - 101.1 - Gospel/Talk
- WYDE - 1260 - Silent
- WYDE-FM - 92.5 - Silent

Orange County, Los Angeles, California

- KBRT - 740 - Christian Talk/Programs

San Diego, California

- KNSN - 1240 - Christian Talk/Programs

Modesto, San Francisco, California

- KCBC - 770 - Christian Talk/Programs

Denver, Colorado

- KLZ - 560 - Conservative Talk
- KLDC - 1220 - Gospel Music/Programs
- KLTT - 670 - Christian Talk/Programs
- KLVZ - 810 - Pop Classics

Chicago, Illinois

- WYCA - 102.3 - Christian Talk/Programs & Gospel
- WSRB - 106.3 - Urban AC
- WPWX - 92.3 - Urban

Rockford, Illinois

- WYRB - 106.3 - Rhythmic Contemporary

Detroit, Michigan

- WMUZ - 1200 - Inspirational/Christian Talk
- WMUZ-FM - 103.5 - Contemporary Christian Music/Talk
- WCHB - 1340 - Gospel Music/Programs
- WRDT - 560 - Christian Talk/Programs

Buffalo, New York

- WDCX-FM - 99.5 - Christian Talk/Programs/Music
- WDCZ - 970 - Christian Talk/Programs/Music (simulcast with WDCX)

Rochester, New York

- WDCX - 990 - Christian Talk/Programs/Music
