= Youth on the March =

- Genre: Religion
- Presented by: Percy Crawford; Ruth Crawford
- Country of origin: United States
- Original language: English

Production
- Camera setup: Multi-camera
- Running time: 30 minutes

Original release
- Network: ABC (1949-1952); DuMont (1952-1953)
- Release: October 9, 1949 – June 7, 1953

Youth on the March is an American religious television program originally broadcast on ABC from October 1949 to May 1952, and by the DuMont Television Network from October 1952 to June 1953. The show was presented by the Young People's Church of the Air, and included religious songs and instruction for children and teens.

== Broadcast history ==
The series was aired “by most of [ABC’s] eleven affiliates”. In each episode, Percy Crawford, his wife Ruth, and their five children appeared. The series was broadcast live from Philadelphia's WFIL.

When Youth on the March was cancelled by ABC in 1952, the series was picked up by the DuMont Television Network for a one-season run, from October 5, 1952, to June 7, 1953. The series continued to air in first-run syndication over a handful of stations until 1958.

== See also ==
- List of programs broadcast by the DuMont Television Network
- List of surviving DuMont Television Network broadcasts

== Bibliography ==
- David Weinstein, The Forgotten Network: DuMont and the Birth of American Television (Philadelphia: Temple University Press, 2004) ISBN 1-59213-245-6
- Alex McNeil, Total Television, Fourth edition (New York: Penguin Books, 1980) ISBN 0-14-024916-8
- Tim Brooks and Earle Marsh, The Complete Directory to Prime Time Network and Cable TV Shows 1946–Present, Ninth edition (New York: Ballantine Books, 2007) ISBN 978-0-345-49773-4
