= WYCA =

Black gospel radio station in Crete, Illinois

Coordinates: 41.326°N 87.621°W

- Crete, Illinois; United States
- Broadcast area: South Suburban Chicago
- Frequency: 102.3 MHz (HD Radio)
- Branding: Rejoice 102.3

Programming
- Format: Urban gospel
- Affiliations: American Urban Radio Networks

Ownership
- Owner: Crawford Broadcasting Co.; (Dontron, Inc.)
- Sister stations: WPWX, WSRB

History
- First air date: October 1, 1964; 61 years ago
- Former call signs: WTAS (1964–1993); WEMG-FM (1993–1997); WYAA (1997–2000); WVJM (2000–2001); WYCA (2001); WYBA (2001–2003)
- Call sign meaning: "Young people's Church of the Air"

Technical information
- Licensing authority: FCC
- Facility ID: 73700
- Class: A
- ERP: 1,050 watts
- HAAT: 152 meters (499 ft)
- Repeaters: 92.3 WPWX-HD2 (Hammond, Indiana); 106.3 WYRB-HD3 (Genoa)

Links
- Public license information: Public file; LMS
- Webcast: Listen live
- Website: www.rejoice102.com

WYCA (102.3 FM "Rejoice 102.3") is a commercial radio station licensed to Crete, Illinois, and serving the southern suburbs of the Chicago metropolitan area. It is owned by Dontron, Inc., a subsidiary of the Crawford Broadcasting Company with studios in Hammond, Indiana. WYCA has an urban gospel radio format. Weekdays begin with a syndicated morning show hosted by Erica Campbell. Some local ministers host Christian talk and teaching shows. Services from several churches are broadcast on Sundays.

WYCA has an effective radiated power (ERP) of 1,050 watts. The transmitter is on South Dixie Highway (Illinois Route 1) near 311th Street in Beecher, Illinois. WYCA broadcasts using HD Radio technology.

== History ==
=== Middle of the road music ===
The station signed on the air on October 1, 1964, as WTAS. It was owned by Anthony Santuccis's South Cook Broadcasting Inc. WTAS had long aired a full service format, airing a variety of local programming and playing middle of the road (MOR) music, which included pop standards and soft AC.

Much of the station's local news, talk and community programming was simulcast until 1992 with its sister station 1600 WCGO in Chicago Heights, Illinois, now off the air. In 1985, the station began airing the Warren Freiberg - Libby Collins Show, which had been heard on 106.3 WLNR in Lansing, Illinois, since 1973.

=== Early gospel years ===
In 1992, WTAS began airing an urban gospel format, simulcasting the programming of 1510 WWHN in Joliet, Illinois. In 1993, the station was purchased by Word of Faith Fellowship, Inc. for $800,000, and on October 22, 1993, its call sign was changed to WEMG-FM, with the station continuing to air a black gospel format. In 1997, the station was sold to Dontron, Inc. for $1.8 million. In summer 1997, the station was taken silent. On October 31, 1997, the station's call sign was changed to WYAA. The station returned to the air January 5, 1998. As WYAA, the station played gospel oldies, love songs, and Christian jazz, along with brokered religious programming.

=== Hot 102 & The Groove ===
On June 1, 2000, the station's call sign was changed to WVJM, and the station adopted an urban contemporary format as "Hot 102". As an urban contemporary station, WVJM "Hot 102" carried the syndicated Doug Banks show. On March 26, 2001, the station's urban contemporary format was moved to longtime gospel station 92.3 WYCA in Hammond, Indiana, along with the call letters WVJM. The call letters WYCA briefly moved to 102.3, before being moved to 106.3 WYBA in Lansing, Illinois, on April 22, 2001, with 102.3 adopting WYBA as its call sign. As WYBA, the station initially aired an R&B format as "The Groove".

=== Rejoice 102 ===
The station switched to its current gospel music format as "Rejoice 102" on February 17, 2003. On September 30, 2003, the station's call sign was changed to WYCA, as 106.3 in Lansing changed its call sign to WSRB and dropped its gospel format in favor of an urban AC format. With the end of the gospel format on 106.3, gospel announcer Darryll King moved her weekday program from 106.3 to 102.3, though she continues to host a show on WSRB on Sundays. WYCA is now the lone religious outlet for Crawford in the Chicago area.

Gospel announcer Darryll King once hosted the morning show. King has won numerous awards for her work in black gospel radio.
