= Tower Plaza (Ann Arbor, Michigan) =

Condominium building

Coordinates: 42.2780°N 83.7426°W

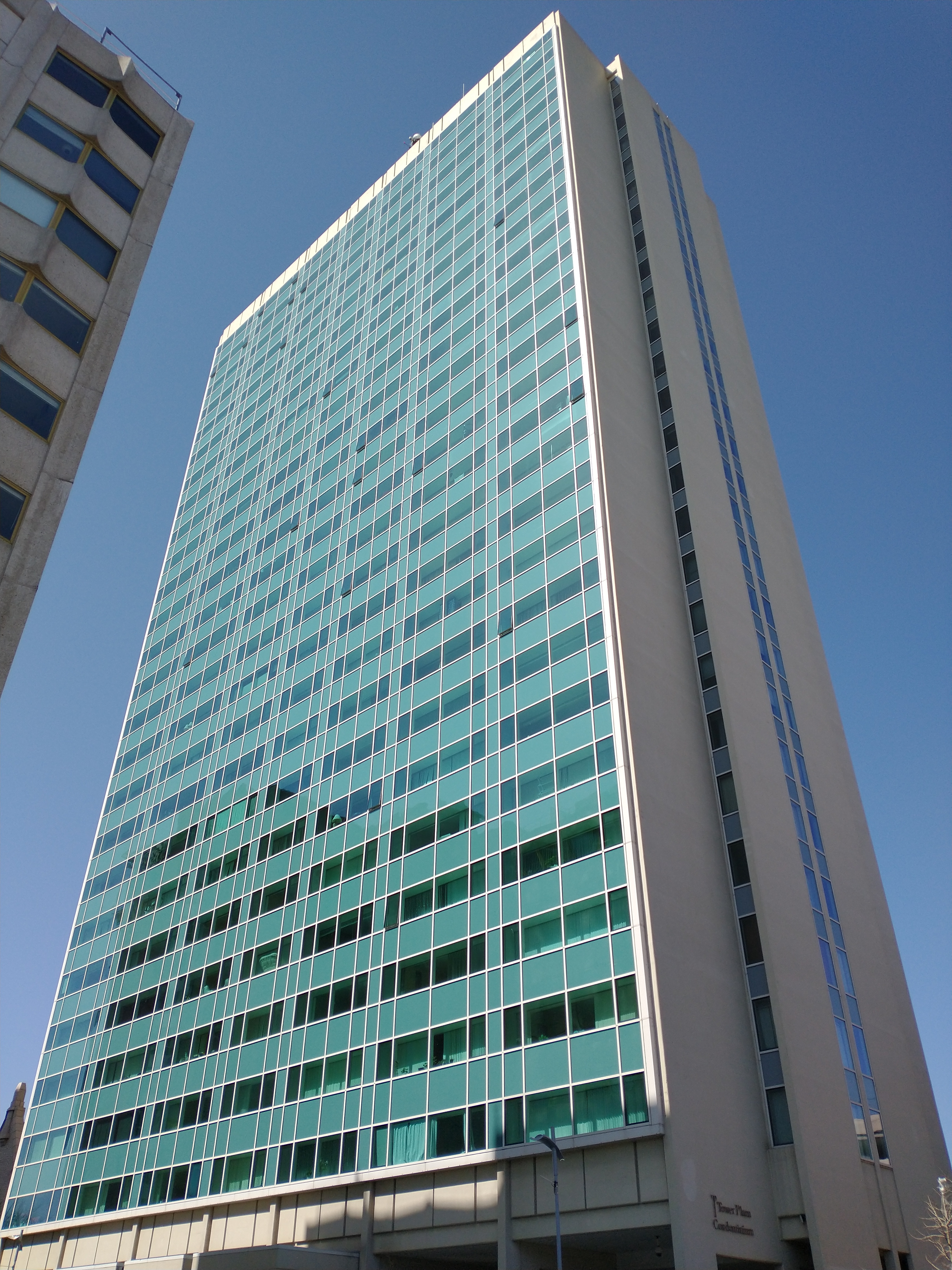
- Street-level view in 2021, looking northwest from William St and Maynard St
- Interactive map of the Tower Plaza area

Record height
- Tallest in Ann Arbor since 1967^{[I]}
- Preceded by: Burton Memorial Tower

General information
- Type: Residential
- Location: 555 East William Street, Ann Arbor, Michigan, United States of America
- Construction started: 1966
- Opened: 1969

Height
- Architectural: 267 feet
- Antenna spire: 292 feet

Technical details
- Floor count: 26

Design and construction
- Developer: John C. Stegeman

Other information
- Public transit access: Served by TheRide routes 5, 6, 24 and 62, 0.3 mi (0.48 km) from the Blake Transit Center

Website
- towerplaza.com

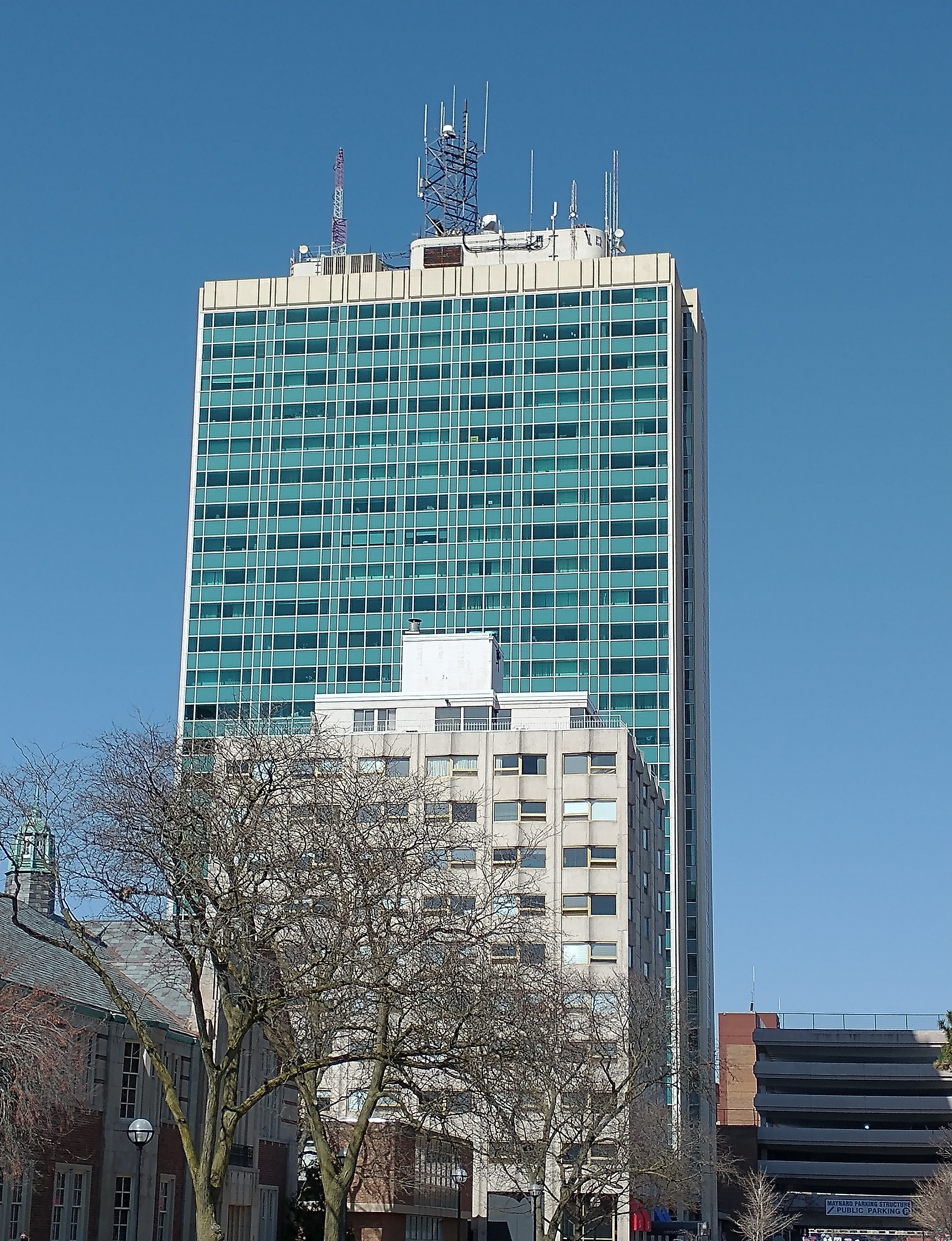
Front view, with 400 Maynard St in the foreground

Tower Plaza is a high-rise condominium building in Ann Arbor, Michigan, located at 555 East William Street. It is the tallest building in Ann Arbor. The building was first proposed in 1965, and opened in 1969. It stands at 26 stories. The antenna stands at 292 feet tall and the roof is 267 feet (81 m) tall. It was designed in the international style of architecture, primarily using concrete and glass. Originally a residential apartment building, it was converted to individually-owned condominiums in 1987. Tower Plaza also has the most buttons of any elevator in Ann Arbor.

Tower Plaza is situated close to the University of Michigan, Ann Arbor campus, and is within 10 miles (16 km) of U.S. Highway 12 (US 12, Michigan Avenue), US 23, and Interstate 94.

== Description ==
Tower Plaza is the tallest building in Ann Arbor, at 26 stories. The next-highest building is University Towers, 536 South Forest Avenue, at 18 stories. It presents a solid face on the west side, and a narrow column of windows in the center of the east side. The main entrance is on William Street.

The base of the tower itself features a small retail space facing Maynard Street, and an attached single-story retail space holds three storefronts.

On a clear day, someone looking out from the highest floors can see the Renaissance Center in Detroit, about 40 miles away.

The building has multiple antennas on its roof, one of them being the transmitter for Cumulus Media-owned adult album alternative radio station WQKL.

== History ==
Tower Plaza was first proposed in 1965, amidst a period of growth in Ann Arbor. Its site on William Street is located in the business district alongside various pars of the University of Michigan's Central Campus. Its developer, John C. "Jack" Stegeman, had completed the 11-story Maynard House across the street years earlier. His company, William Street Company, constructed, owned, and managed the building.

The initial proposal was met with backlash from City Council, prompting a debate about the character of downtown. Another component of the controversy was parking, which was not required by law at the time, but was proposed voluntarily by the developer. This voluntary proposal became a mandatory condition of the building's final occupancy permit. The building's design was not modified to add parking, and instead the developers of the building chose to underwrite an expansion of the nearby Maynard Street garage. One result of this controversy was a 1967 change to local building codes that would make additional buildings like Tower Plaza impossible to build today. This controversy resembled an earlier controversy in the 1920s about Forest Plaza.

Construction began in 1966, and was completed in 1969, delayed by construction worker strikes in 1968.

The narrower east and west sides of the building, currently unadorned concrete, were the subject of various proposals in the 1970s. Following budget cuts during Tower Plaza's construction, the initial plans for marble sides were abandoned, and concrete substituted instead. A 1974 contest, in advance of the 1976 United States Bicentennial, awarded prizes of up to $500 to local artists for designs on the concrete sides, but the artwork selected was never applied to the building.

In 1987, the building's owners attempted to sell the building to an Ann Arbor-based company, PreMark Associates, which would then convert the building to condominiums. The deal with PreMark fell through, and the building owners instead engaged Triad Management Corporation for the same purpose. The successor to Triad Management continues to provide services to the Tower Plaza condominium association as of 2022.

The original gray glass on the south side of the building, facing William Street, was replaced with new green glass in 2006. Similar green glass was installed on the north and east faces of the building in 2017.
