= WWWW-FM =

- Ann Arbor, Michigan; United States
- Frequency: 102.9 MHz (HD Radio)
- Branding: 102.9 W4 Country

Programming
- Format: Country
- Subchannels: HD2: WTKA simulcast
- Affiliations: Michigan Wolverines

Ownership
- Owner: Cumulus Media; (Cumulus Licensing LLC)
- Sister stations: WLBY, WQKL, WTKA

History
- First air date: May 21, 1962
- Former call signs: WOIA (1962–1970); WNRZ (1970–1975); WIQB (1975–1992); WIQB-FM (1992–2000); WWWW (2000–2006); WFOR-FM (2006)
- Call sign meaning: "W" 4 times

Technical information
- Facility ID: 41080
- Class: B
- Power: 50,000 watts
- HAAT: 134.1 meters (440 ft)
- Transmitter coordinates: 42°15′4″N 83°48′28″W

Links
- Webcast: Listen live
- Website: w4country.com

WWWW-FM (102.9 FM), is a commercial radio station licensed to Ann Arbor, Michigan. It is owned by Cumulus Media and it broadcasts a country music format, known as W4 Country. The studios and offices are on Victors Way in Ann Arbor.

WWWW-FM has an effective radiated power (ERP) of 50,000 watts, the maximum for this part of Michigan. The transmitter is on West Waters Road at South Zeeb Road, west of downtown Ann Arbor.

== History ==
=== Early years ===
The station, created by Saline residents (including puppeteer Meredith Bixby and the town's mayor, Henry Leutheuser) signed on the air on May 21, 1962. The original call sign was WOIA and it was co-owned with WOIB in Saline, Michigan. Originally, WOIA and WOIB simulcast a full service, middle of the road (MOR) music format with some Top 40 music played on weekends. The format changed to full-time Top 40 in 1967. WOIA disc jockeys during this time included John Records Landecker, later to become a legend in Chicago radio, and Art Vuolo Jr., later to become known as "Radio's Best Friend".

In 1970, the stations became WNRS and WNRZ, "Ann Arbor's Winners". The "Winners" airstaff included Arthur Penhallow, who later became a fixture at WRIF in Detroit for nearly 40 years. At WNRS/WNRZ, his air name was "Cicero Grimes". "Winners" took advantage of Ann Arbor's status as a breakout market for songs that later went on to success in the Detroit market, proclaiming: "Winners Plays... Detroit Watches".

The two stations soon separated their programming, with WNRS adopting a country format and WNRZ becoming a full-time 24-hour free-form progressive rock station. Former WABX personalities Jerry Goodwin and Ann Christ worked at WNRZ in 1972, and John Sinclair also hosted a Sunday-evening show. The station built up a loyal following in Ann Arbor's "hippie" community, but was financially unsuccessful.

That led owner Thomas Boodell to change the station to a simulcast of WNRS's country programming and change the locks at the station to keep the former progressive-rock hosts out of the studio. After a petition to restore the progressive programming generated 10,000 signatures, Boodell relented by reinstating progressive rock on the station nightly from 9 p.m. to 6 a.m. This split format continued until November 1974, when the station became again temporarily a full-time simulcast of WNRS as preparations were made for the stations' sale to Community Music Services of Rochester, New York. At this time, the FM station's facilities were upgraded.

WNRZ-FM was a pioneer in the many aspects of the radio industry, most notably improvements to the quadraphonic FM stereo system invented in 1969 by Louis Dorren and improved upon by station chief engineer Brian Brown. The station participated in the National Quadraphonic Radio Committee field trials for the Federal Communications Commission (FCC). WNRZ-FM was actually the first FM station to transmit program audio in quadraphonic sound. Brown also designed and built one of the first combination audio equalizer/compressors, which was used to enhance the poor audio quality of the Collins (now Rockwell Collins) AM radio transmitter at WNRZ. A second device was installed to process the quadraphonic FM program audio. These units gave the effect of the audio to "leap out" of the radio.

Community Music Services took over control of WNRZ in December 1974 and four months later, there was a brief stunting period proclaiming "Something BIG is coming to 103 FM". The station's format was returned to album rock. This time, however, without the free-form elements and with an approved station playlist. The new call sign was WIQB. The call letters I-Q-B were chosen because of their resemblance to the station's frequency numbers 1-0-3. The first record played on the new W-103 was "You Can't Always Get What You Want" by the Rolling Stones. WIQB heavily promoted its quadraphonic sound, identifying on-air as QuadRock 103 during the 1970s. In 1979, the DJ lineup consisted of John Christian, Randy Z, Jim Dulzo, Chuck Horn and others.

As the 1980s dawned, WIQB, under new owner Ernie Winn, modified its format from album rock to a Top 40 - AOR mixture. During the '80s, Rock 103 was usually the highest-rated local station in the Ann Arbor market. Jingles touted the fact the station was "Ann Arbor's Number One!" In 1987, the station boosted power to 50,000 watts, dramatically increasing its coverage area to the west (toward Jackson) and north (toward Fenton), although the station's eastward signal remained impeded in the Detroit area by 102.7 FM WKSG (now WDKL).

The station went through numerous ownership changes from 1974 onward. During the mid-1990s, WIQB became an adult album alternative station under the ownership of Arbor Radio, LP. In late 1997, Cumulus Broadcasting took control of the station and switched WIQB's format to active rock. WIQB subsequently crashed in the ratings and was regularly defeated in its own market by Detroit's WRIF. With the poor ratings, General Manager Ray Nelson, along with the sales department, proceeded to change the format to country.

=== History of "W4" ===
The WWWW call letters were originally used for 106.7 FM (and later 1130 AM) in Detroit. Many Detroit-area radio listeners of the 1970s remember WWWW-FM as a rock station with a slightly progressive lean. It would offer unique programming, such as the "All-Night Album Replay", where several full rock LPs would be played consecutively during a given evening. Print advertising for the station occasionally featured images of Godzilla, the mythical character seen in the Toho-produced Japanese series of feature films. That format would not extend into the 1980s, however. The change to the country format (nicknamed "W4 Country") alienated many former listeners, as reflected in initial ratings changes. It soon acquired an entirely new audience, though a rare few individuals (such as on-air personality Chuck Santoni, who is now at WSAQ-FM in Port Huron) remained with the station. In reality, the station maintained its country format much longer than the previous rock format. In October 2000 "Alice 106.7" finally changed its call letters to "WLLC-FM" while the "WWWW" call letters were moved to 102.9 FM in Ann Arbor to relaunch "W4 Country" on September 29, 2000.

The new "W4 Country" soon became a ratings success in Ann Arbor. Arbitron often rates WWWW-FM as the top music station in the market.

W4's signal into metropolitan Detroit is impeded by WDKL in Mount Clemens in Macomb County, but it still frequently shows up toward the bottom of the Detroit ratings. W4's signal is much stronger toward the south, west and north of Ann Arbor, and the station gets a listenable signal as far away as Flint, Lansing, and Toledo.

On the top of every hour, the station still uses its W4 jingles from 106.7 in the late 90s.

=== Changes in 2006 ===
On July 24, 2006, the call letters for 102.9 FM in Ann Arbor were temporarily changed to WFOR-FM, as Clear Channel moved the "WWWW" call letters to the 1310 AM facility in Detroit. One week later, on July 31, 102.9 switched to WWWW-FM, different in only the "-FM" suffix. On September 15, 2006, the WDTW call letters returned to 1310 AM.

This sequences of moves of the WWWW call letters were likely due to a swap of the Clear Channel Ann Arbor cluster to Cumulus Broadcasting, which was still pending in late December 2007.

== In popular culture ==
WWWW has been used as the call letters of fictional and satirical radio stations in media from time to time:

- On an episode of The Great Space Coaster, Goriddle Gorilla used the call sign for his pathetic attempt to have an all weather radio station.
- On Denis Leary's album, Merry Fuckin' Christmas, he satirised a boring soft rock station with the call letters (also calling it "WW2-The Big One", after World War II).
