= Wolfbox =

DI unit

The Wolfbox is the name for the original passive DI unit, direct box, or DI as invented in the late 1950s by Dr. Edward Wolfrum, PhD, alumnus engineer of Motown, Golden World Records, Terra-Shirma Studios, Metro-Audio Capstan Roller Remote recording, and United Sound Systems in Detroit, Michigan. Used by James Jamerson, Dennis Coffey, Bob Babbit and other The Funk Brothers, the Wolfbox was a key component in the 1960s and 1970s sound of recorded music in the Motown/Detroit scene.

== Origin ==
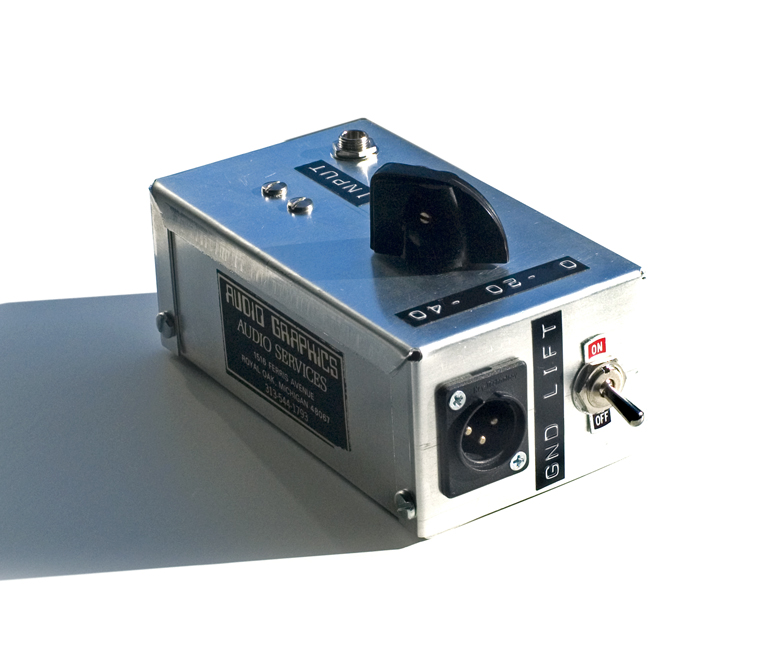
A vintage Wolfbox

According to Wolfrum, the idea for the creation of the device originally came to him out of necessity, from "…Recording bands back then [early 1960s] and the fact that I simply couldn't afford microphones." It was at Detroit's WEXL in 1962 that 16-year-old staff engineer Wolfrum incorporated his newly created passive direct interface box – later known at the "Wolfbox" – as an interface from the high-impedance output of church PA systems to the microphone input of broadcast audio mixers.

== Recent versions ==
In 2013, a limited-edition run of 25 new Wolfboxes were designed, plotted, supervised & signed by Dr. Wolfrum, in a non-exclusive (unlicensed) agreement with Acme Audio Mfg. Company. Using NOS components and original A-11J and A-12J triad transformers sourced from vintage gear, these new versions found their way to such places as Nashville's Blackbird Studios, London's Abbey Road, and to Blue Note Records President and bassist Don Was. After the 25-unit production, Dr. Wolfrum ended his Acme collaboration and released his schematic of the Wolfbox in 2014 for free public non-commercial use. Now Acme Audio Mfg. Co. produces "The Motown DI" which uses a new transformer inspired by the original OEM Triad transformers, and is a partial clone of a DI box used on a small number of recordings at Motown.

== Molybdenum and limited resources ==
The original Wolfboxes relied on vintage A-11J and A-12J Triad transformers whose metal structure (i.e. Molybdenum composition) became regulated due to mining and manufacturing toxicity by OSHA and EPA restrictions.
