= WRDT =

Radio station in Monroe–Detroit, Michigan

- Monroe, Michigan; United States
- Broadcast area: Metro Detroit
- Frequency: 560 kHz (HD Radio)
- Branding: The Word AM 560

Programming
- Format: Christian radio

Ownership
- Owner: Crawford Broadcasting; (WMUZ Radio, Inc.)
- Sister stations: WCHB; WMUZ; WMUZ-FM

History
- First air date: July 12, 1956
- Former call signs: WMIC (1956–1959); WQTE (1959–1975); WHND (1975–1996); WLLZ (1996–2003)
- Call sign meaning: The Word Detroit

Technical information
- Licensing authority: FCC
- Facility ID: 25083
- Class: D
- Power: 500 watts (day); 14 watts (night)
- Transmitter coordinates: 41°53′28″N 83°25′39″W (day); 42°27′13″N 83°9′50″W (night)
- Translator: 107.1 W296DY (Detroit)
- Repeater: 103.5 WMUZ-FM HD3 (Detroit)

Links
- Public license information: Public file; LMS
- Webcast: Listen live
- Website: wrdt560.com

WRDT (560 AM) is a commercial radio station licensed to Monroe, Michigan, United States, and serving Metro Detroit. Owned by Crawford Broadcasting, the station carries a Christian radio format branded "The Word AM 560". The studios are on Capitol Avenue in the Weatherby section of Detroit. WRDT has two distinct transmitter sites: the daytime site is on Vineyard Road in Monroe, while the nighttime site is on Radio Plaza in Ferndale. It broadcasts in the daytime using HD Radio technology.

Programming is also heard on 99-watt FM translator W296DY at 107.1 MHz and on the third digital subchannel of WMUZ-FM.

== History ==
=== WMIC and WQTE ===
The station signed on the air on July 12, 1956. The original call sign was WMIC, which stood for the owner, the McIntyre Broadcasting Company. It featured a block programmed variety format, including some early rock and roll shows.

In 1959, the station was purchased by Dick Jones, Ross Mulholland and the Brink family, and its call letters were changed to WQTE. Originally, WQTE aired what would now be called an adult contemporary music format, but in 1960 the station made a shift.

=== Top 40 ===
WQTE began playing a teen-oriented Top 40 format, dubbing itself "Cutie Radio" and "Fabulous 56." It issued a weekly music survey called "The Cutie Music Meter". The Production Director was Bob Bennett, who later became the general manager of Bob Hope's radio station WBMJ in San Juan, Puerto Rico. WQTE personalities during this time included Tom Clay (who emceed popular dances for the station at Cobo Hall), and Ed McKenzie, best remembered to Detroit audiences as "Jack the Bellboy" on WJBK radio in the late 1940s and early 1950s. Also heard on WQTE during this time was Ralph Binge and Eddie Chase.

After a year of competing against rival Top 40 stations WJBK, WXYZ, WKMH and, to a lesser extent, CKLW, for the ears of Detroit's teen audience, WQTE gave up on Top 40.

WQTE flipped to an easy listening/middle of the road (MOR) format, becoming a modest success. The morning drive time announcer was Roy Blair, who later joined WJBK-TV.

=== "Honey Radio" oldies ===
In 1974, Greater Media acquired WQTE and switched it from easy listening/MOR to oldies. It was a memory of WQTE's early Top 40 years, playing the hits of the 1950s and 1960s as "Honey Radio". It began shadowcasting the oldies format heard on WHNE (94.7 FM). The AM station's call letters were changed to WHND on March 28, 1975. "Honey Radio" was one of the first all-oldies stations in the nation and specialized in music from the first generation of rock and roll including doo-wop hits.

Honey Radio featured a playlist incorporating records that never made, or scored low on, the national charts but were hits in the Detroit market. WHND, like its FM counterpart, was completely automated in the first few years, using a syndicated format from Drake-Chenault called "Classic Gold". But the station went live and local in 1980 under the guidance of consultant Paul Christy.

It took a few years for everything to gel, but by 1987, "Honey Radio" had become not only an oldies station, but a re-creation of the sound of early 1960s Top 40 radio. Oldies fans enjoyed WHND's disc jockeys, whom they perceived to be as passionate about the music as they were. The DJs also had a strong community presence, with frequent remotes and "cruise" broadcasts around the area.

Initially, "Honey Radio" programming was also heard on sister station WHNE, but in 1976, Greater Media changed format of the FM to soft adult contemporary as "Magic 94.7 WMJC". "Honey Radio" continued as a standalone format on AM 560 for almost two more decades.

WHND picked up competition from a number of FM oldies stations during the late 1980s, including WKSG, CKLW-FM and WOMC, with WOMC eventually coming to dominate in the format. As oldies fans increasingly tuned to FM stations, WHND's ratings fell. The station dropped its local programming and switched to Satellite Music Network's "Kool Gold" format.

=== Spanish programming and Christian radio ===
On December 2, 1994, "Honey Radio" came to an end, as Greater Media began to broker time on the station to local Spanish-language broadcasters. On April 1, 1996, WHND changed its call letters to WLLZ, picking up the call sign dropped by Detroit's 98.7 FM after its change from album rock to smooth jazz as WVMV. WLLZ's format remained brokered Spanish for another year.

In June 1997, Greater Media sold WLLZ to [[[Crawford Broadcasting]], which changed the format to Christian talk and teaching, as AM 560, The WMUZ Word Station. The actual call sign remained WLLZ, but it used this positioner to tie the station to Crawford's flagship contemporary Christian outlet, WMUZ-FM. The AM station's call letters were changed to WRDT on August 11, 2003. The station remained in AM stereo even after the end of the oldies format.

The WLLZ call sign was reassigned to an LP (low power) TV station in the Traverse City area shortly after AM 560 dropped them. Then in 2019, they were picked up by iHeartMedia for its classic rock station at 106.7 in Detroit, now known as WLLZ.

=== FM translator ===
In early 2018, WRDT's programming began to be simulcast on FM translator W296DY at 107.1 MHz. However, on April 13, 2018, Cumulus Media filed a complaint with the Federal Communications Commission (FCC) regarding interference with the signal of the company's Ann Arbor-based station WQKL, which also broadcasts at 107.1 FM. After operating for a short period at reduced power, Crawford Broadcasting took W296DY silent on April 24, 2018.

Crawford Broadcasting did some work on the translator. The power was reduced to 99 watts and a directional antenna was installed to minimize interference with WQKL. The translator was returned to the air later in 2018.

=== Tower collapse ===
On June 9, 2025, while farm work was being done in the field where WRDT's daytime transmitter and towers reside, a farm tractor snagged a guy wire on one of the four towers on the site, causing the tower to collapse and temporarily taking WRDT off the air. No injuries occurred from this incident. Crawford Broadcasting afterward filed for special temporary authority from the FCC (which was later approved) to temporarily broadcast from its separately located nighttime transmitter site full time, at 125 watts non-directional during daytime hours while maintaining its ordinary nighttime signal. After insurance claims were processed, WRDT planned to rebuild the tower and resume daytime transmissions from that site in the future. By November 2025, normal transmissions had resumed from the Monroe facility.

== See also ==
- Media in Detroit
