= KNSN (AM) =

Christian radio station in San Diego

Simulcasting KBRT, Costa Mesa, CA
- San Diego, California; United States
- Broadcast area: San Diego
- Frequency: 1240 kHz
- Branding: K-BRITE

Programming
- Format: Christian radio

Ownership
- Owner: Crawford Media Group; (Kiertron, Inc.)
- Sister stations: KBRT

History
- First air date: 1947
- Former call signs: KSON (1947–1996, 1997–2009); KDDZ (1996–1997)

Technical information
- Licensing authority: FCC
- Facility ID: 30831
- Class: C
- Power: 550 watts
- Transmitter coordinates: 32°41′39.2″N 117°7′20.1″W
- Translator: 103.3 K277DG (San Diego)

Links
- Public license information: Public file; LMS
- Webcast: Listen live
- Website: kbriteradio.com

KNSN (1240 AM) is a radio station licensed to San Diego, California, United States. Owned by Crawford Media Group through licensee Kiertron, Inc., it airs a brokered Christian format, mostly simulcast with KBRT (740 AM) in Costa Mesa. Studios for KBRT and KNSN are on Airway Avenue in Costa Mesa.

KNSN's transmitter is sited off Newton Avenue in San Diego, at the intersection of Route 15 and Interstate 5. KNSN is also heard on low-power FM translator K277DG at 103.3 MHz in San Diego.

== History ==
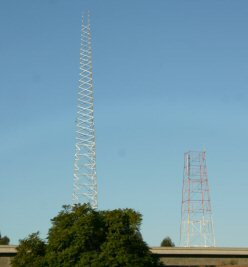
KNSN (New-Left; Old-Right)

The station signed on in 1947 as KSON. KSON used a 250-watt RCA transmitter with a tower that was 250 feet tall. The station was owned and operated by Fred Rebal.

Through the 1960s, 1970s and 1980s, KSON was a country music station, mostly simulcast with KSON-FM (97.3 FM, now on 103.7 FM). In 1985, KSON-AM-FM were acquired by Jefferson Pilot Broadcasting. On July 24, 1996, the AM station's format was changed to children's radio as KDDZ, with the call sign standing for "Kids." It started as a KidStar Radio Network affiliate; that network was short-lived and closed on February 14, 1997. A year later the station gave children's radio another try with Radio Disney in late January 1998, which lasted until July 1, 2003.

During a heavy rain and wind storm near the end of December 2004, approximately half of the radio antenna tower collapsed and fell, leaving the tower at a height of about 200 feet. It had been 442 feet tall.

Later, KNSN was a gospel music radio station, having that format from January 2007 until July 2007. The station was sold to Multicultural Broadcasting Inc., owned by Arthur Liu, on June 1, 2009. In the early 2000s, it shifted to a Spanish-language Christian radio format.

On May 22, 2014, Crawford Broadcasting announced it would acquire KNSN for $1.5 million through licensee Kiertron, Inc. The sale was consummated on July 25, 2014, with the Spanish Christian programming shifting to 1040 KURS. KNSN went silent in late July 2014 in preparation for a new format under Crawford Broadcasting ownership. KNSN returned to air on September 29, 2014. The format ended up being the previous religious format, this time in English. It is mostly a simulcast of co-owned KBRT in Costa Mesa.

In 2017, a 15-watt FM translator station was added, 103.3 MHz K277DG. It shares the same broadcast tower as the AM signal. The translator is often cut off as distant station KRUZ in Santa Barbara, the dominant station at 103.3, often hashes out K277DG's signal in tropospheric ducting.
