= Acoustic Café =

Syndicated radio program

- Running time: 2 hours
- Country of origin: United States
- Language: English
- Syndicates: self-syndicated
- Starring: Rob Reinhart
- Recording studio: Ann Arbor, Michigan
- Original release: 1995
- Opening theme: "Million Dollar Intro" by Ani DiFranco
- Website: acafe.com

Acoustic Café is an independent, syndicated radio program, produced in Ann Arbor, Michigan, United States. (Not to be confused with the Japanese instrumental group of the same name founded by Norihiro Tsuru.) Started in 1995, Acoustic Café presents singer-songwriters in various genres, playing songs in the Acoustic Café studio and chatting with host Rob Reinhart. A selection of current and past recorded material (on CDs) is also a part of each weekly program.

Over the years Acoustic Café has presented artists including John Prine, John Mayer, M Ward, Emmylou Harris, Beck, Tori Amos and Ani DiFranco (whose "Million Dollar Intro" is the music played at the program's opening and closing). New, up-and-coming talent remains a constant of Acoustic Cafe's mission.

Acoustic Café can be heard on commercial and non-commercial radio stations around North America, and worldwide on Voice Of America. Web broadcasts and a streaming archive are also widely available on the net.

By 2010, Acoustic Café had grown to 90+ terrestrial radio affiliates and expanded its online presence and archive (link below).

Acoustic Café began taping sessions on the road in 2012, with sessions held at both the national Folk Alliance convention (2/12, Memphis, TN) and Midwest Regional convention (10/12, St. Louis).

In 2013, Acoustic Café and SongCraft Presents in New York joined forces to create new songs at SXSW in Austin, TX. Songwriters were invited to a secret location in Austin to work with SongCraft Presents' Ben Arthur to create a brand new song in a 3-hour session. The demos were then taken back to New York for the creation of the finished song. Acoustic Café aired interviews with the artists, as well as extended segments about the creation of the new songs. At the end of 2013, SXSW announced that the Acoustic Café/SongCraft Presents sessions would be an official part of the 2014 SXSW.

2013 also saw Acoustic Café recording a special session with Billy Bragg on stage at Americanafest in Nashville, TN (9/13), and the launch of a new performance space called The Leon Loft, in partnership with Leon Speakers of Ann Arbor, MI. Leon Loft sessions from Fitz & The Tantrums, Mike Doughty, Lord Huron and more have been airing on the program in 2014.

Acoustic Café entered its 20th year of syndication in January, 2014. Also in 2014, Acoustic Cafe and SongCraft Presents returned to SXSW, where they partnered with Subway Restaurants to create The Subway Sessions. As in 2103, songwriters created new songs in a 3-hour session, documented in both video and audio. Additionally, Acoustic Cafe and SongCraft presented a panel at the conference to discuss the creative process and debut some of the new songs created in Austin between 3/10 and 3/15, 2014. SXSW coincided with Acoustic Cafe's 1000th continuous weekly broadcast.

2014 was the inaugural year of the Acoustic Cafe curated new-folk series at St. Cecilia Music Center, Grand Rapids, MI. Rhiannon Giddens and Justin Townes Earle were part of the series in St. Cecilia's 2014-15 season. The partnership was renewed for the 2015-16 season, including shows with The Steel Wheels, Shawn Colvin, Alejandro Escovedo and Leo Kottke. 2016-17's season included Margo Price, Marc Cohn, Langhorne Slim and Pokey LaFarge.

In 2015, Acoustic Cafe and SongCraft Presents partnered with Ford Motor Company for their "Songs Of The Road" series. Similar to the previous work with songwriters at SXSW, "Songs Of The Road" took artists on short road trips where they worked with Ben Arthur (SongCraft Presents) to create a brand new song. The songs were then recorded at a studio, and premiered in front of a live audience, using the car (2015 Ford CMAX Energi) for amplification. 5 new songs were created, and the videos and audio were turned into a web series to accompany the radio features on Acoustic Cafe. The trips/artists/studios were:

1. Lera Lynn, Nashville to Memphis, TN, Sun Studios (Memphis, TN)
2. Jackie Venson, Lake Travis to Bee Cave to Austin, TX, one room schoolhouse (Bee Cave, TX)
3. David Mayfield, Santa Barbara to Los Angeles, Village Recorders (Los Angeles, CA)
4. Andy Suzuki & The Method, Brooklyn to Woodstock, NY, Applehead Recording Studio (Woodstock, NY).
5. Shara Worden (My Brightest Diamond), Ann Arbor to Detroit, MI, United Sound Systems Recording Studios (Detroit, MI).

The Acoustic Cafe/SongCraft team was invited to present an @Google Talk about the "Songs Of The Road" in New York on 11/20/15.

The flagship radio station for Acoustic Café is WQKL 107.1 FM in Ann Arbor, which carries the program twice each weekend, on Saturday and Sunday mornings.

Country 99.9 sometimes simulcast this program.
