= WCHB =

- Royal Oak, Michigan; United States
- Broadcast area: Detroit metropolitan area
- Frequency: 1340 kHz (HD Radio)
- Branding: AM 1340

Programming
- Format: Urban gospel

Ownership
- Owner: Crawford Broadcasting; (WMUZ Radio, Inc.)
- Sister stations: WMUZ, WMUZ-FM, WRDT

History
- First air date: October 1925 (as WAGM)
- Former call signs: WAGM (1925–1931); WEXL (1931–2017)
- Call sign meaning: Wendell Cox and Haley Bell

Technical information
- Licensing authority: FCC
- Facility ID: 61679
- Class: C
- Power: 1,000 watts
- Transmitter coordinates: 42°28′10″N 83°6′54″W
- Translator: 96.7 W244DL (Detroit)

Links
- Public license information: Public file; LMS
- Webcast: Listen Live
- Website: wchb1340.com

WCHB (1340 kHz) is a commercial AM radio station licensed to Royal Oak, Michigan, and serving the Detroit metropolitan area. It broadcasts an urban gospel radio format and is owned by Crawford Broadcasting. The station is a reporter to Billboard's Nielsen/BDS Gospel airplay panel. The radio studios and offices are shared with co-owned WMUZ, WMUZ-FM (which simulcasts WCHB on its second digital subchannel) and WRDT, on Radio Plaza in Ferndale, Michigan.

WCHB broadcasts in the HD format. It is powered at 1,000 watts, using a directional antenna in the daytime. The transmitter is on West Woodward Heights Boulevard in Ferndale, near Interstate 75. Programming is also heard on 99-watt FM translator W244DL on 96.7 MHz in Detroit.

== History ==
=== WAGM ===
WCHB is among the oldest stations in the Detroit area. Its original call sign was WAGM, and it was first authorized in October 1925. The station initially operated under a "temporary permit", and was formally licensed on August 19, 1926. (A 1985 article claimed it went on the air sometime in October 1923.)

The original WAGM licensee was Robert L. Miller, and the station's call letters referenced his father, Alexander G. Miller, a former Royal Oak mayor. These two also operated the A.G. Miller Furniture and Radio Shop. In its first several years, the station had a power of 50 watts and broadcast three nights a week.

=== WEXL ===
WAGM went silent in 1929 due to the death of Alexander Miller. It was sold to Rev. Jacob B. Spark and Judge George B. Hartrick later that year. The station returned to the air using the call letters WEXL ("We Excel") in early 1931. The station carved out a niche with a local, block-programmed schedule, including country music aimed at men who migrated from the Southern United States who went to work in Detroit's automobile assembly plants.

It was at WEXL in 1962 that 16-year-old staff engineer Ed Wolfrum incorporated his newly created passive direct interface box – later known at the "Wolfbox" when he went to "Motown" – as an interface from the high-impedance output of church PA systems to the microphone input of broadcast audio mixers. This "DI unit" later influenced what became known at "The Motown Sound" as a more transparent alternative to recording instrument amplifiers.

In the early 1960s, it tried a Top 40 format with limited success. So WEXL expanded its country music programming to a full-time format in 1963, the first station in metro Detroit to do so. The station was successful for a number of years. A 1966 Billboard magazine poll showed WEXL as the most influential country station in the southeastern Michigan area by far. However, the station got competition in late 1969 when WJBK 1500 (now WLQV) flipped from Top 40 to a modern country sound as WDEE.

=== Christian and Gospel programming ===
WEXL stayed the course for a time with a mixture of modern and traditional country, but in 1974 the station dropped country music in favor of all-Christian radio programming. Current owner Crawford Broadcasting acquired WEXL in 1997 and changed the station's format from a combination of Christian preaching and motivational talk to urban gospel.

In 2016, WEXL added an FM translator, fed by sister station WMUZ's HD Radio digital subchannel. It began simulcasting WEXL programming on 96.7 MHz at 99 watts. The signal is highly directional to the north, to protect the more powerful CHYR-FM in Leamington, Ontario, and WNUC-LP to the east, both of which are also on 96.7 MHz.

On October 1, 2017, WEXL's call sign was changed to WCHB, as Crawford Broadcasting moved the call from its newly acquired AM 1200 WMUZ. Ironically, the WCHB call was first used in 1956 at 1440 on the AM dial, which is now WCHB's competitor station, WMKM.

== See also ==
- Media in Detroit
