= WXJC (AM) =

- Birmingham, Alabama; United States
- Broadcast area: Greater Birmingham
- Frequency: 850 kHz (HD Radio)
- Branding: Truth 101.1

Programming
- Format: Christian radio

Ownership
- Owner: Crawford Broadcasting Company; (Kimtron, Inc.)
- Sister stations: WDJC-FM; WXJC-FM; WYDE; WYDE-FM

History
- First air date: 1946
- Last air date: 2026
- Former call signs: WTNB (1946–1950); WILD (1950–1957); WYDE (1957–1998, 1999–2002); WMKI (1998–1999); WDJC (2002–2004)

Technical information
- Licensing authority: FCC
- Facility ID: 74245
- Class: B
- Power: 50,000 watts (day); 1,000 watts (night)
- Transmitter coordinates: 33°37′25″N 86°44′45″W
- Translator: 96.9 W245CS (Birmingham)
- Repeaters: 101.1 WXJC-FM (Cullman); 93.7 WDJC-FM HD2 (Birmingham)

Links
- Public license information: Public file; LMS
- Webcast: Listen live
- Website: www.wxjcradio.com

WXJC (850 AM, "Truth 101.1") was a commercial radio station licensed to Birmingham, Alabama, United States. It was owned by the Crawford Broadcasting Company with the license held by Kimtron, Inc. WXJC and WXJC-FM 101.1 jointly simulcast a Christian talk and teaching format with some southern gospel and worship music. The studios were on Summit Parkway at West Valley Avenue.

WXJC's transmitter was sited near Pawnee Village Road at Cleage Road in Birmingham. Programming was also heard on FM translator W245CS at 96.9 MHz.

== History ==
=== WTNB and WILD ===
The station signed on the air in 1946. Its original call sign was WTNB, broadcasting with 250 watts on 1490 kHz. It was originally a network affiliate of the Mutual Broadcasting System. The call letters reflected the initials of the station's original owner, Thomas N. Beech.

In the 1950s the station was sold to Madison Broadcasting and changed its frequency to 850 and its call sign to WILD. It kept that call until the station was sold in September 1957.

=== Top 40 and country ===
Bartell Broadcasters bought the station in 1957 and changed the call letters to WYDE. By the late 1950s, WYDE was one of three stations in Birmingham playing Top 40 hits, along with WSGN and WVOK.

In 1965 WYDE changed formats, dropping Top 40 and becoming a country music station. Unlike some country stations, WYDE's presentation was more polished and urbane. The station's tagline was WYDE (pronounced like "wide") Countrypolitan. For the remainder of the 1960s and throughout most of the 1970s, the station had no direct competition in the format. This changed in 1976 when WVOK dropped its longstanding Top 40 programming and switched to country as well.

=== Oldies and children's radio ===
By 1977 WYDE had a second and perhaps more serious competitor as a country music station, when WZZK became the first FM station in Birmingham to flip to country music. As more country listeners switched to WZZK for its FM stereo sound and better fidelity, WYDE saw its ratings decline. In 1982, it dropped country to become Birmingham's first station to play oldies from the 1950s through the early 1970s.

In 1984 the station was sold and became a Christian talk and teaching station with some Christian music. Throughout the remainder of the 1980s and 1990s, the station tried several different formats, including beautiful music and talk radio in an attempt to gain listeners.

On November 18, 1996, the station switched to children's radio. It became one of Radio Disney's charter affiliates, as part of the network's test launch before going national the following year. The station later switched its call sign to WMKI in 1998. The call letters referred to Mickey Mouse, a popular Disney cartoon character.

=== Talk and Christian radio ===
Crawford Broadcasting bought WMKI in 1999. Upon assuming control of the station, the company changed the station's format to talk radio on November 15, 1999, and returned the heritage call sign of WYDE to the station.

The station was assigned the callsign WXJC by the Federal Communications Commission (FCC) on July 15, 2004. At that point, the station became a mix of Christian talk and teaching along with southern gospel music.

As of October 26, 2016, this station was being heard on Birmingham area translator W245CS 96.9 FM.

WXJC had broadcast in the HD Radio format.

On November 5, 2018, WXJC switched its FM repeater (and the callsign WXJC-FM) from 92.5 at Cordova to 101.1 at Cullman.

The FCC cancelled the WXJC AM license on October 1, 2026.
