= WSRB =

Urban adult contemporary radio station in Lansing, Illinois

Coordinates: 41.579°N 87.546°W

- Lansing, Illinois; United States
- Broadcast area: Chicago metropolitan area; Northwest Indiana
- Frequency: 106.3 MHz (HD Radio)
- Branding: 106.3 WSRB

Programming
- Format: Urban adult contemporary

Ownership
- Owner: Crawford Broadcasting Co.; (Dontron, Inc.)
- Sister stations: WPWX, WYCA

History
- First air date: August 28, 1961; 65 years ago
- Former call signs: WLNR (1961–1991); WJPC-FM (1991–1994); WEJM-FM (1994–1997); WYBA (1997–2001); WYCA (2001–2003)
- Call sign meaning: "Soul and R&B"

Technical information
- Licensing authority: FCC
- Facility ID: 6590
- Class: A
- ERP: 4,100 watts
- HAAT: 121 meters (397 ft)
- Repeater: 106.3 WYRB-HD2 (Genoa)

Links
- Public license information: Public file; LMS
- Webcast: Listen live
- Website: www.1063chicago.com

WSRB (106.3 FM) is an urban adult contemporary radio station serving the Chicago metropolitan area and Northwest Indiana. It is licensed to the Southland suburb of Lansing, Illinois. Weekdays begin with the nationally syndicated Rickey Smiley Morning Show with local DJs heard the rest of the day. The station is owned by Crawford Broadcasting with studios and offices in Hammond, Indiana.

WSRB has an effective radiated power (ERP) of 4,100 watts. The transmitter is on Bernice Road off the north side of the Kingery Expressway in Lansing. WSRB broadcasts in the HD Radio format.

== History ==
=== WLNR ===
The station began broadcasting on August 28, 1961, as WLNR, which stood for "West Lansing Near Railroad". It aired a full service format playing middle of the road (MOR) music, including pop standards and easy listening. In the 1970s, talk programming would begin to occupy more of the station's schedule, with religious programming airing in overnights. From 1973 to 1985, the station was home to the Warren Freiberg - Libby Collins Show, which would later be heard on WCGO (1600 AM) in Chicago Heights, Illinois, and WTAS in Crete, Illinois.

The station was purchased by Johnson Publishing Company in 1985. In the late 1980s and early 1990s, the station aired a soft urban contemporary format branded "Soft Touch", which was simulcast on its sister station AM 950 WJPC.

=== WJPC-FM ===
On March 11, 1991, WLNR relaunched as "J106". On April 15, 1991, the station's call sign was changed to WJPC-FM, which stood for Johnson Publishing Company, the station's owner at the time. This gave the station the same call sign as its sister station, AM 950 WJPC. The two stations continued to simulcast and aired an urban AC format, and competed against WVAZ. WJPC (AM) then broke off from the simulcast and flipped to a rap-heavy urban contemporary format in July 1992.

=== WEJM ===
In June 1994, Broadcast Partners, which owned WVAZ, acquired WJPC AM/FM from Johnson Publishing. The new owners changed the call sign to WEJM-FM, and flipped the format to a rap-heavy urban contemporary sound as "106 Jamz" on June 19. This effectively returned the stations to a full-time simulcast, and placed the stations in competition with the market's urban contemporary leader, 107.5 WGCI-FM. The AM simulcast partner also changed call letters to WEJM.

Broadcast Partners later merged with Evergreen Media in July 1995. In March 1997, due to several mergers which put Evergreen over federally-mandated ownership limits, WEJM-FM was sold to Crawford Broadcasting, The station changed its format to urban gospel in April; its simulcast partner 950 WEJM (which was sold to Personal Achievement Radio) continued to air the urban/rap format for several months after until it flipped to sports talk as an affiliate of the One-on-One Sports Network on August 28.

=== WYBA/WYCA ===
During this time, WYBA aired urban gospel music and brokered religious programming as "Your Born Again Gospel Station". On December 1, 1999, the station's branding was changed to "Power 106", and the brokered religious programming that aired on the station were moved to sister stations WYCA and WYAA, giving 106.3 a full-time Urban Gospel format.

The call sign was changed to WYCA in 2001, after the previous WYCA at 92.3 FM dropped its longtime gospel/brokered Christian format in favor of urban contemporary. The WYBA call sign moved to 102.3.

=== WSRB ===
The station adopted an urban adult contemporary format on September 30, 2003. Meanwhile, the urban gospel format moved to WYCA 102.3 FM.

WSRB was the home to the syndicated Love, Lust and Lies with Michael Baisden. It was also the home to the Steve Harvey Morning Show until August 1, 2007. On March 25, 2009, rival WVAZ dropped The Tom Joyner Morning Show in favor of Harvey's. That triggered WSRB to bring Joyner's show back to the Chicago airwaves on April 22, 2009.

Until June 2010, "Soul 106.3 FM" had a synchronous sister station, WYRB, airing on the same frequency and serving Rockford and DeKalb, Illinois. WYRB dropped out of the simulcast in June 2010 and adopted a standalone rhythmic contemporary format under the name "Power 106.3". Soul 106.3 continues to air on 106.3 HD2.

On November 1, 2010, WSRB dropped its urban AC format for talk under the banner "Real Radio." Joyner and Baisden were retained under the new format due to their shows being less music and more talk. They were joined by The Dave Ramsey Show and The Warren Ballentine Show throughout the day. The station continued to play Adult R&B music, but during the late evenings and weekends.

In August 2011, WSRB dropped the name "Real Radio" and switched back to calling itself "Soul 106-3", but the programming was initially unchanged. In 2014, the station dropped the D.L. Hughley syndicated afternoon show after only a year. (Hughley replaced Michael Baisden in many markets in 2013.)

In late 2016, WSRB dropped the "Soul 106-3" branding, and is simply referred to as "106-3" or sometimes "106-3 Chicago". Under the name brand change, it skewed its urban adult contemporary format to include classic hip hop in addition to R&B and soul music. In June 2017, the station dropped the Tom Joyner Morning Show in favor of a local morning drive hosted by Mike Love. Love's show was later replaced by The Rickey Smiley Morning Show.
