= WYRB =

Coordinates: 42.074°N 88.823°W

- Genoa, Illinois; United States
- Broadcast area: Rockford–DeKalb
- Frequency: 106.3 MHz (HD Radio)
- Branding: Power 106.3 FM

Programming
- Format: Rhythmic contemporary
- Subchannels: HD2: Urban adult contemporary (WSRB simulcast); HD3: Urban contemporary gospel (WYCA simulcast)
- Affiliations: Premiere Networks

Ownership
- Owner: Crawford Broadcasting Co.; (Dontron, Inc.)

History
- First air date: 2001
- Former call signs: WOXM (1995–2001); WSQR-FM (2001); WYCH (2001–2003)
- Call sign meaning: "Your R&B" (previous format)

Technical information
- Licensing authority: FCC
- Facility ID: 21202
- Class: A
- ERP: 3,800 watts
- HAAT: 126 meters (413 ft)

Links
- Public license information: Public file; LMS
- Webcast: Listen live
- Website: www.mypower106.com

WYRB (106.3 FM), known locally as Power 106 is a rhythmic contemporary radio station serving Rockford, Illinois, licensed to nearby Genoa. It is owned by Crawford Broadcasting. WYRB broadcasts in HD.

== History ==
Up until June 2010, WYRB was a simulcast of Chicago's WSRB and offered an urban adult contemporary format. However, realizing that there was a hole for a rhythmic format in Rockford and at the same time tapping into an audience looking for another alternative to Top 40/CHR WZOK, Crawford decided to split up the simulcast and refocus WYRB on the Rockford area as a rhythmic top 40. According to sales manager DiAnna Cantele Mazzola, "They identified that R&B wasn’t taking off and felt there was a niche to be filled for the urban market," and added "Now it’s today’s hits and hip-hop, and club music that really doesn’t get played a lot."
