= Norihiro Tsuru =

Japanese violinist and composer

Norihiro Tsuru 都留教博
- Born: Japan
- Genres: Animé music score New-age music, J-pop
- Occupations: Violinist, composer
- Years active: 1989–present
- Labels: Museo d'Arte Ghibli, Sony Records, Pioneer

Norihiro Tsuru (都留教博) is a Japanese violinist and composer. He has composed the scores to several anime series, including the anime film and OVA series of The Heroic Legend of Arslan, Mermaid's Forest and Mermaid's Scar.

He released his first album "月をつくった男" in 1989. He also organized the New-age music group Acoustic Cafe in 1990 (not related to the American radio programme Acoustic Café).

Acoustic Café is composed of cellist Ayako, pianist Rie Nishimoto and violinist and keyboardist Norihiro Tsuru.

Perhaps his best-known standalone piece is Last Carnival, a bittersweet work in G-minor for violin, cello and piano.

== Recordings ==
- Acoustic Café: For Your Loneliness (2001)
- Acoustic Café: For Your Memories (2003)
