= WMUZ-FM =

- Detroit, Michigan; United States
- Broadcast area: Metro Detroit
- Frequency: 103.5 MHz (HD Radio)
- Branding: 103.5 WMUZ Truth Talk

Programming
- Format: Christian radio
- Subchannels: HD2: Urban gospel (WCHB); HD3: Christian talk (WRDT)

Ownership
- Owner: Crawford Broadcasting; (WMUZ Radio, Inc.)
- Sister stations: WRDT, WCHB, WMUZ

History
- First air date: November 11, 1958
- Former call signs: WMUZ (1958–2017)
- Call sign meaning: Muzak

Technical information
- Licensing authority: FCC
- Facility ID: 73298
- Class: B
- ERP: 50,000 watts
- HAAT: 142 meters (466 ft)
- Transmitter coordinates: 42°22′40″N 83°14′32″W

Links
- Public license information: Public file; LMS
- Webcast: Listen live
- Website: wmuz.com

WMUZ-FM (103.5 FM, "103.5 WMUZ Truth Talk") is a commercial radio station licensed to Detroit, Michigan. Owned by Crawford Broadcasting, it broadcasts a Christian radio format devoted primarily to talk and teaching programming, as well as Contemporary Christian music.

WMUZ-FM has an effective radiated power (ERP) of 50,000 watts. The studios and transmitter are on Capitol Avenue near Burt Road in the Weatherby section of Detroit. WMUZ-FM transmits in HD and simulcasts religious sister stations WCHB and WRDT on its second and third digital subchannels respectively.

== History ==
The station signed on the air as WMUZ on November 11, 1958. The station originally was powered at 110,000 watts, before the Federal Communications Commission (FCC) set 50,000 watts as the maximum for stations in the Detroit area. WMUZ-FM reduced its power to the standard 50,000 watts when it relocated to a taller tower. In effect, it kept the same Class B coverage area, despite the reduction in power.

WMUZ-FM has always been owned by Crawford Broadcasting. Its original general manager was Dr. Al Black while Crawford Broadcasting founder Percy Crawford was the president. After Percy's death, his son Donald took over his role. In addition to carrying brokered Christian radio programs, WMUZ once aired ethnic shows on the weekend, including broadcasts in Polish, Romanian, Arabic and German.

On August 24, 2017, Crawford Broadcasting acquired a Detroit AM station at 1200 kHz. It put the WMUZ call sign on that station, requiring 103.5 to add the "-FM" suffix to its call letters. As many of the Christian talk and teaching programs moved over to the AM station, WMUZ-FM increased its hours playing CCM.

Previous logo

== HD programming ==
WMUZ-FM broadcasts using HD Radio technology. Its HD-2 digital subchannel was formerly known as Z-2, which played "Christian Alternative Rock" music by day and "Holy Hip Hop" music at night. Z-2 was later discontinued. Currently, the HD2 subchannel is a simulcast of Urban Gospel formatted sister station WCHB 1340 AM.

The HD3 subchannel simulcasts "The Word" Christian talk programming heard on co-owned WRDT 560 AM.
