= WTKA =

- Ann Arbor, Michigan; United States
- Broadcast area: Southeast Michigan
- Frequency: 1050 kHz
- Branding: The Big 1050 WTKA

Programming
- Format: Sports
- Network: Westwood One Sports
- Affiliations: Detroit Red Wings; Detroit Tigers; Michigan Wolverines; Westwood One Sports

Ownership
- Owner: Cumulus Media; (Cumulus Licensing LLC)
- Sister stations: WLBY, WQKL, WWWW-FM

History
- First air date: April 26, 1945
- Former call signs: WPAG (1945–1987); WPZA (1987–1993)
- Call sign meaning: "TalK" (previous format) or "Ticket" (previous branding), Ann Arbor

Technical information
- Licensing authority: FCC
- Facility ID: 47116
- Class: B
- Power: 10,000 watts day 500 watts night
- Transmitter coordinates: 42°8′46″N 83°39′36″W
- Repeater: 102.9 WWWW-HD2 (Ann Arbor)

Links
- Public license information: Public file; LMS
- Webcast: Listen live
- Website: thebig1050.com

WTKA (1050 AM) is a commercial radio station in Ann Arbor, Michigan, known as "The Big 1050 WTKA." It broadcasts a sports radio format and is owned by Cumulus Media. The studios and offices are on Victors Way in Ann Arbor.

By day, WTKA is powered at 10,000 watts, covering most of southeast Michigan. Because 1050 AM is a Mexican clear channel frequency reserved for XEG in Monterrey, WTKA reduces power to 500 watts at night to avoid interference. It uses a directional antenna with a four-tower array. The transmitter is on Stony Creek Road in York Charter Township, Michigan.

== Programming ==
TheMichiganInsider.com's Sam Webb and WTKA Program Director Ira Weintraub host "The Michigan Insider" weekday mornings. The show features prominent sports guests, including sports writer John Bacon, Yahoo Sports contributor Eric Adelson, and frequent interviews with University of Michigan coaches John Beilein, Carol Hutchins, Erik Bakich and more. One of the most popular features on "The Michigan Insider" is "Recruiting Roundup" at 7:45am with the latest information on Michigan football and basketball recruiting. The segment is recorded and is available on the station's website.

In afternoon drive time, WTKA features 'The M-Zone' with Jamie Morris. The rest of the schedule mostly comes from CBS Sports Radio. WTKA also carries Detroit Red Wings hockey, Detroit Tigers baseball and Michigan Wolverines college football, hockey and basketball.

== History ==
=== WPAG ===
In the 1920s, there were three short-lived radio stations licensed to Ann Arbor: WMAX (1922), WQAJ (1923; owned by the Ann Arbor News) and WCBC (1924–25; owned by the University of Michigan). In addition, WJBK (now WLQV), licensed to nearby Ypsilanti, signed on in 1925. In 1940, WJBK was moved to Detroit, leaving Washtenaw County without a radio station until WPAG first took to the air. It signed on the air on April 26, 1945.

WPAG's studios were located on the third floor of the Hutzel Building, at the corner of Main at Liberty Streets in Ann Arbor. (Currently, a digital service called A3 Radio netcasts from the old WPAG studios.) Owned by brothers Paul and Art Greene, the call letters WPAG were selected to reflect their names. (For many years there was a ladies lingerie and apparel store down on the Hutzel Building's first floor, which caused long-time University of Michigan football broadcaster Bob Ufer to joke that WPAG really stood for "Women's Panties And Girdles".) WPAG also briefly operated a television outlet, WPAG-TV on channel 20 in the 1950s.

=== Top 40 Hits ===
In the 1960s, WPAG was one of several stations in the Ann Arbor market featuring Top 40 musical fare. One of its most popular personalities was Dave Pringle, who later became a fixture on Detroit radio as "Dave Prince." (He adopted that name after Billboard Magazine mistakenly referred to him as such in one issue, and Pringle decided he liked "Prince" better.) The station is also notable for being possibly the first to play Bob Seger, who grew up in Michigan. In 1961, Seger convinced the station to play a demo of "The Lonely One," a song he had recorded with his group at the time, the Decibels.

By 1970, WPAG had transitioned to a full service format featuring MOR/adult contemporary music. It was an affiliate of the ABC Information Network. The station remained successful until the late 1970s, when a recession led to declining business and forced the laying off of several employees. An early 1980s change to an adult standards format garnered the station increased audience, but from advertiser-unfriendly older demographics. After a return to the station's longtime AC format proved unsuccessful, WPAG made a switch to country music after Christmas of 1985. The new "1050 Country", consulted by Ed Buchanan of Grand Rapids' successful WCUZ, was intended as a cosmopolitan variant of the country format for Ann Arbor and mixed in compatible soft rock titles by artists such as Bob Seger and Crosby, Stills and Nash, alongside current and classic country hits.

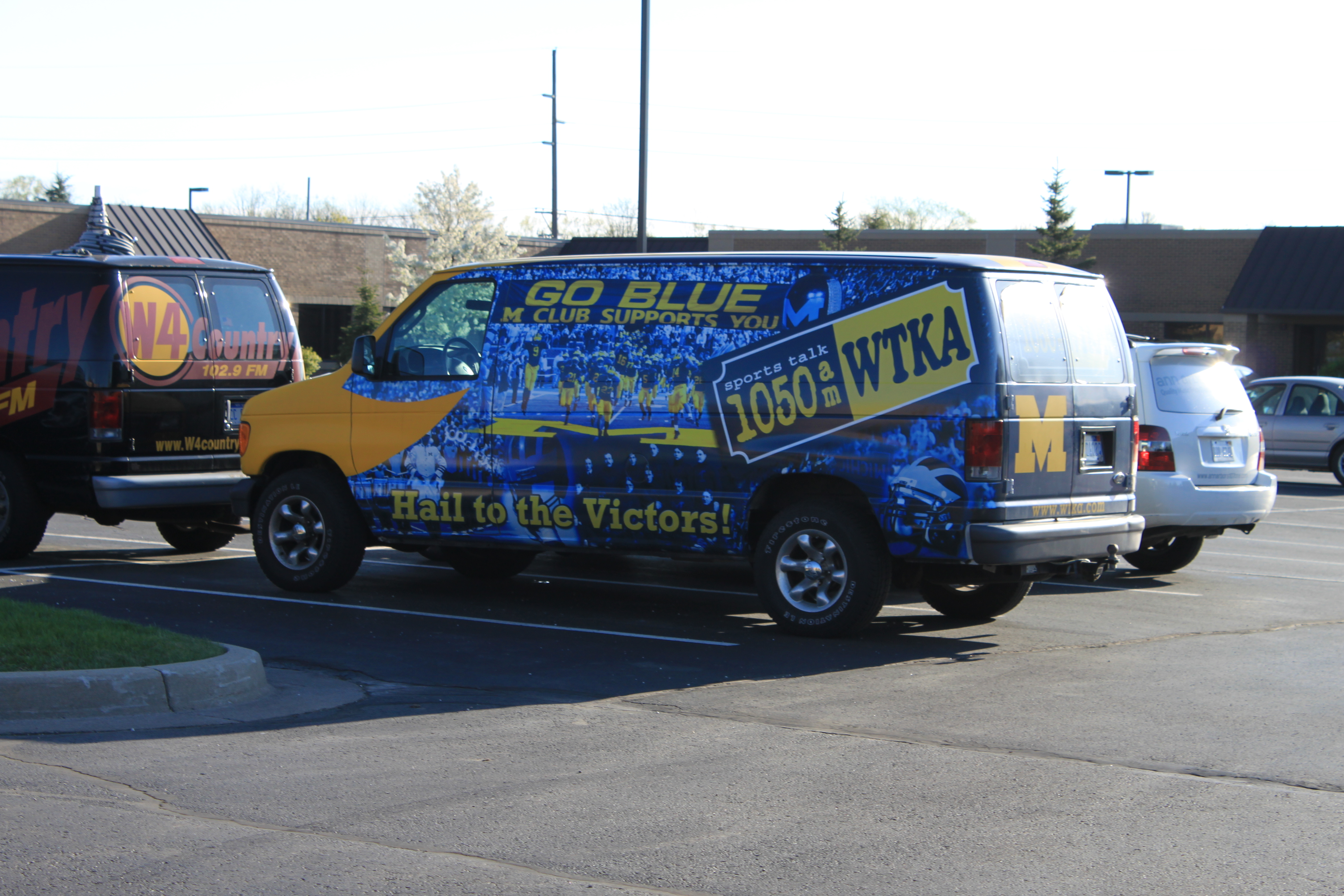
WTKA remote van

=== WPZA and WTKA ===
In December 1987, the station was purchased by Tom Monaghan and had its call sign changed to WPZA, a nod to Monaghan's thriving Domino's Pizza business. Under Monaghan, the unsuccessful cosmopolitan country format was dumped for another stab at full-service adult contemporary. In late 1992, Monaghan (who later owned Ave Maria Radio, including Ypsilanti's WDEO), sold WPZA to the MW Blue Partnership. Eventually, it went to Cumulus Broadcasting and then to Clear Channel Communications.

Clear Channel flipped the station to WTKA. In 1997, WTKA's daytime schedule featuring a variety of programming, ranging from local sports and financial talk shows, a farm report, the nationally syndicated Joy Browne advice show, the Alan Colmes talk show, and the One-on-One Sports Network.

=== Sports Radio ===
Former logo

In 1999, WTKA began using the brand name "The Ticket" and revamped its program lineup to be primarily sports programming, with ESPN Radio outside of local shows and the farm report. WTKA is once again owned by Cumulus Broadcasting due in part to a multi-station swap between Cumulus and Clear Channel that involved stations in Michigan And Ohio.

Today, WTKA bills itself as "Sports Talk 1050 AM", the official voice of the University of Michigan sports in Ann Arbor. It is not, however, the flagship station. That status belongs to WCSX 94.7 in Detroit. Sports Talk 1050 AM carries U-M college football, basketball, and hockey as well as Detroit Red Wings hockey and Detroit Tigers baseball. The Tigers are a holdover from the WPZA era, as Monaghan also owned the Tigers at that time.

On April 23, 2007, WTKA fired former University of Michigan hockey player Dave Shand from the station. Shand served as the co-host for the morning show titled "In the Locker Room with Dave Shand." The station gave no reason for the firing. Shand claims University of Michigan athletic director Bill Martin pressured the station to fire him, but a lawsuit against Martin on this claim was dismissed for lack of evidence.

On August 26, 2024, WTKA rebranded as "The Big 1050 WTKA".

== See also ==
- Media in Detroit
