= WQKL =

- Ann Arbor, Michigan; United States
- Broadcast area
- Frequency: 107.1 MHz
- Branding: ann arbor's 107one

Programming
- Format: Adult album alternative
- Affiliations: United Stations Radio Networks

Ownership
- Owner: Cumulus Media; (Cumulus Licensing LLC)
- Sister stations: WLBY, WTKA, WWWW-FM

History
- First air date: March 7, 1969
- Former call signs: WPAG-FM (1967–1989); WAMX (1989–1992)
- Call sign meaning: Kool 107 (previous branding)

Technical information
- Licensing authority: FCC
- Facility ID: 47117
- Class: A
- ERP: 3,000 watts
- HAAT: 88 meters (289 ft)
- Transmitter coordinates: 42°16′41″N 83°44′32″W

Links
- Public license information: Public file; LMS
- Webcast: Listen Live
- Website: www.annarbors107one.com

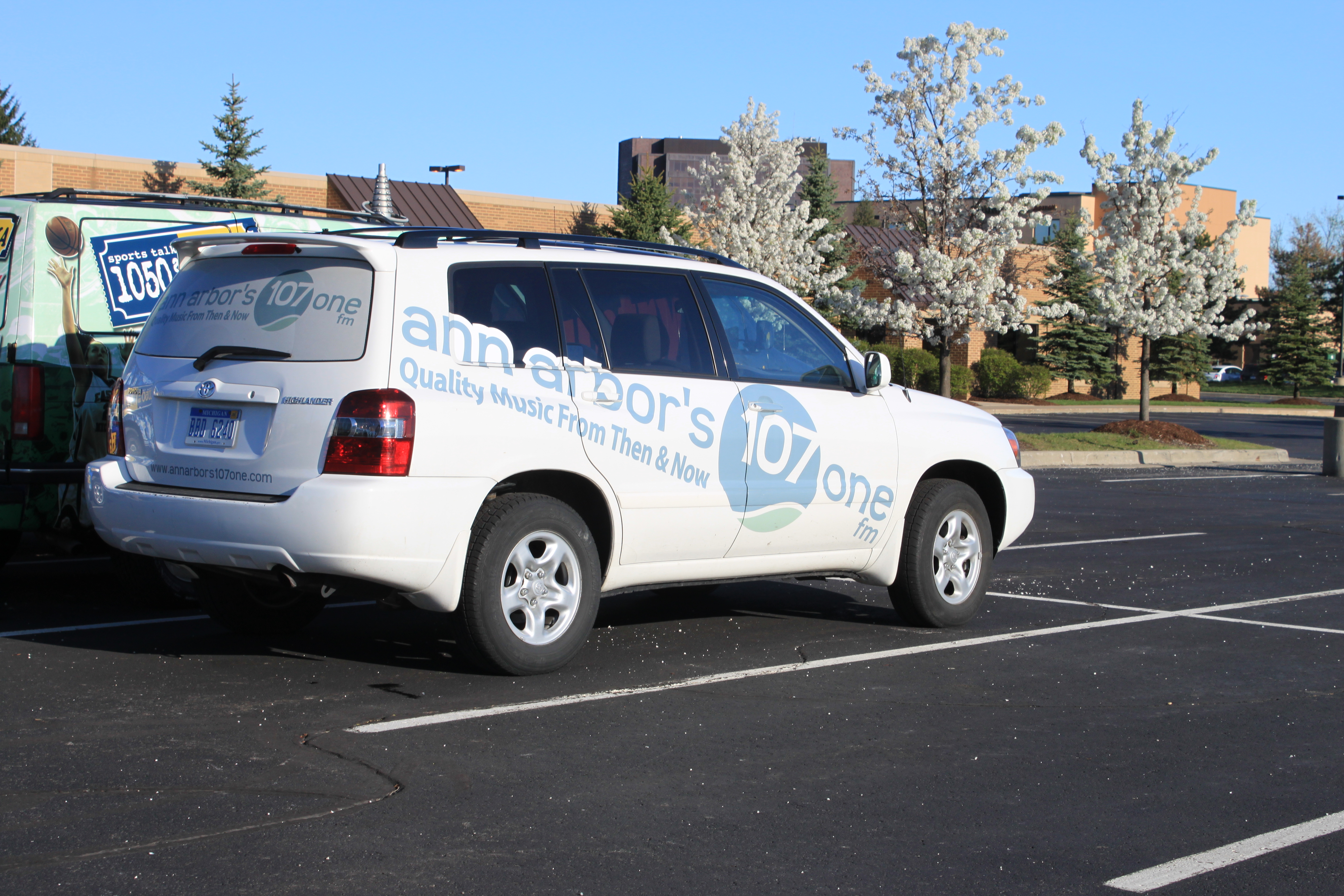
WQKL remote van

WQKL (107.1 FM), known on the air as ann arbor's 107one, is a commercial radio station in Ann Arbor, Michigan. WQKL is owned by Cumulus Media, airing an adult album alternative/alternative rock radio format. WQKL has its studios at the south area of Ann Arbor near Briarwood Mall, and broadcasts its signal from a 3,000 watt transmitter atop Tower Plaza in the city's downtown.

Despite its low power, it can be heard in many of the western Detroit suburbs as a result of its transmitter being 289 feet tall and located on the roof of Ann Arbor's tallest building. WSAQ in Port Huron and WTLZ in Saginaw both occupy the same frequency to the east and north respectively, and interference often occurs in northeast areas.

== History ==
=== WPAG-FM ===
WPAG has had two lives on the FM dial. The Federal Communications Commission originally authorized WPAG-FM to operate at 98.7 FM in 1947. But with few people owning FM radios in those days, management gave up the license in 1953. (In 1961, WBFG in Detroit took over the 98.7 frequency in southeast Michigan.) On February 14, 1967, WPAG was given FCC permission to resurrect its FM station at the current 107.1 frequency, but it was not until March 7, 1969 that the station finally went to air.

As with the original WPAG-FM, the new station originally simulcast its middle-of-the-road sister station, AM 1050 WPAG (now sports-talk WTKA). By the end of the 1960s, though, the FM outlet began to air separate programming (mostly folk and rock music) during the evening hours, while keeping the AM simulcast during the day. This was changed in 1972 to an eclectic Americana music format including bluegrass, folk, and old Western music. By the mid-1970s, WPAG-FM was also playing beautiful music on weekends.

By 1980, the population of Ann Arbor had topped 100,000, and due to FCC rules, WPAG-FM would only be able to simulcast a small portion of the AM programming. The first decision was to convert the eclectic Americana country shows on WPAG-FM into a full-time format, but after a few months that was ditched in favor of automated Top 40. But this format also failed to catch on, and by the summer of 1982, WPAG-FM had reverted to a full-time easy listening/beautiful music sound. Through all these changes, the station had few listeners.

=== Mix 107 and Kool 107 ===
In 1987, WPAG-FM was acquired by Domino's Pizza mogul Tom Monaghan. While WPAG-AM changed its call letters to WPZA (meaning "pizza," as in "Domino's"), WPAG-FM retained its call letters, although its beautiful music format was updated to include new age music. In 1989, "Easy 107" WPAG-FM changed its call letters to WAMX and became Mix 107 FM, Ann Arbor's Best Mix, playing a locally programmed mix of smooth jazz, new age music, and soft pop and soul vocals. WPAG's calls were changed to "WPZA" Three years later, the station was acquired by MW Blue Partnership, and the call sign and format changed once again, to WQKL as Kool 107, Ann Arbor's Official Oldies Station. One of Kool 107's most memorable on-air liners declared, "Kool 107 plays great oldies because today's music... sucks!" Local radio icon Lucy Ann Lance hosted Kool 107's morning show. Former KOOL 107 PD Dave Anthony and MD Greg Stucki resurfaced in York, Pennsylvania oldies station 96.1 WSOX in 1998. Anthony left the station in 2007 to go to Pittsburgh as Program Director of the Froggy country network.

In the fall of 1998, Kool 107 dropped virtually all of the pre-1965 music on its playlist and began to supplement the oldies format with hits from 1975 to 1990, from artists like Hall & Oates, Madonna, Michael Jackson, Huey Lewis and the News, Toto, Sade, and The Pointer Sisters. The new music mix was tagged "Adult Contemporary Gold," although the station retained the "Kool 107" moniker. By 1999 Cumulus Media owned the station, and took a further step toward evolving the format to AC by adding Delilah's syndicated love songs show for the evening hours.

Clear Channel Communications became the owner of WQKL in 2000. Clear Channel slowly evolved WQKL's format closer to AC over the next several years, and by 2003 the station was playing some current AC chart hits despite remaining primarily oldies-based. Yet the station continued to flounder in the local ratings, with its Arbitron showings ranging from mediocre to awful, and Kool 107 was regularly defeated in the Ann Arbor market by its own Detroit-based Clear Channel AC sister station, 100.3 WNIC. Kool 107 also lost Lucy Ann Lance around this time; she eventually surfaced doing the morning show at talk-formatted competitor AM 1600 WAAM and remained there until she was laid off at the end of 2007 due to budget cuts. She now hosts a late-morning show at WQKL's sister station, AM 1290 WLBY.

=== ann arbor's 107one ===
Previous logo under previous colors and former slogan

On June 25, 2004, "Kool 107" signed off for good and then Program Director Rob Walker and General Manager Bob Bolak created ann arbor's 107one. WQKL's ratings have since improved. Martin Bandyke served as WQKL Morning host from 2006 - 2022. Bandyke is a longtime veteran of Detroit's WDET, who was let go from the Wayne State University-owned station as part of programming changes that resulted in the station dropping all of its daytime music shows in favor of NPR news and talk.

WQKL tags its format as "It's Different Here" The format is a Triple A/Adult Rock mix including artists such as U2, Jack Johnson, The Police, Coldplay, Dave Matthews Band, Alanis Morissette, The Pretenders, Sheryl Crow, Wilco, KT Tunstall, R.E.M., Peter Gabriel, Depeche Mode, Hozier, Tom Petty, Natalie Merchant, Tracy Chapman, Noah Kahan and boygenius.

In August 2006, it was announced that Clear Channel's radio stations in Ann Arbor and Battle Creek would be traded to Cumulus in exchange for rocker WRQK in Canton, Ohio. That put WQKL and its sister stations would once again be under the Cumulus umbrella. The deal was announced in late December 2006. WQKL also had a competitor in CIDR-FM 93.9 "The River" in Windsor, Ontario, which in September 2006 reverted to the adult alternative format (they have since flipped to CHR as "Virgin Radio 93.9" as of November 2020); CIDR-FM had little to no effect on WQKL in both the Ann Arbor and Detroit radio ratings during its entire run.

==== Programming ====
WQKL is known for "New Music Mondays" and "Featured Artist Fridays." During Featured Artist Fridays, the station plays a certain artist once an hour through the whole day to celebrate a new album, an artists' birthday, an event in music history or an artist coming to the area. Featured Artist Friday tends to avoid playing the same everyday songs from the artist and focus on new tracks, album tracks, covers they've done, demos and live music. In addition, weekends feature a wide range of eclectic music programs, including the syndicated Acoustic Cafe with Rob Reinhardt and New Wave Nation with former MTV VJ Nina Blackwood, as well as local shows such as Fine Tuning with morning host Martin Bandyke, Tree Town Sound (local artists) with Matthew Altruda, Mark Copeland hosts Under the Radar Radio (new and indie music) and Sonic Bliss, a Sunday-night program featuring ambient, chill and dream-pop sounds. Sonic Bliss is now syndicated on several stations including WCNR in Charlottesville, Virginia, WKLQ in Grand Rapids, Michigan, WXVU in Philadelphia and AndHow.fm in New Zealand.

WQKL and Borders Books (headquartered in Ann Arbor) hosted free live music performances/CD signings and broadcast these performances live on the air. Artists like Barenaked Ladies, Indigo Girls and Suzanne Vega were featured at events at Borders original store on Liberty Street in the heart of downtown Ann Arbor. These events ended when Borders closed in 2011. In addition, the station's Christmas-season "Rockin' for the Hungry" food drive (a holdover from the station's days as Kool 107), which benefits Food Gatherers of Washtenaw County, is generally quite successful. From 2013 to the present, WQKL broadcasts live tapings for Acoustic Cafe at Leon Speakers with Rob Reinhart hosting and station listeners invited to watch, these tapings air on a future edition of Acoustic Cafe, which is produced in Ann Arbor..

While the station's ratings overall (ages 12+) are fairly average, WQKL has done very well in its target demographic of adults aged 25–54; in spring 2009, both major survey companies ranked the station #1 in this demo, ahead of its country-music powerhouse sister station WWWW-FM and of Detroit's WJR, which usually is Ann Arbor's top-ranked commercial station overall. Both stations, along with WDVD, also in Detroit, are sister stations. During the University of Michigan's Homecoming Weekend in 2023, WQKL launched its Made In Michigan initiative, playing local and Michigan artists throughout the week instead of just Sunday evenings. This includes artists like The War and Treaty, Laith Al-Saadi, The Accidentals, Vulfpeck, Tally Hall, Joshua Davis and May Erlewine.

WQKL partners with Bank Of Ann Arbor to present Sonic Lunch, a weekly free, live concert series almost every Thursday between Memorial Day and Labor Day at Liberty Plaza in downtown Ann Arbor. 2025 is the 18th season for Sonic Lunch.

Martin Bandyke was let go from WQKL in February 2009 due to budget cuts, but, in a surprising move given the current radio climate, was rehired a few weeks later due to an outcry from listeners (who even started a protest group on the social networking website Facebook) and advertisers. Bandyke returned to WQKL on March 2, 2009, and remained in the morning slot until his semi-retirement in December 2022. (1) Bandyke still contributes to the station and continues to host his Sunday program called "Fine Tuning" which features a wider, more eclectic mix of music than the station normally programs, reminiscent of Bandyke's show at WDET. WQKL welcomed Detroit radio vet Scott Vertical as the new Morning host at the start of 2023.

As of April 2026, the weekday on-air lineup at WQKL consists of: Scott Vertical 6-10 a.m., Kelly Brown 10 a.m.-3 p.m., Mark Copeland 3-7 p.m., along with The One They Call Derek and Cojo taking turns from 7-10 p.m., and Eric Black from 10pm-12am.
