= WLBY =

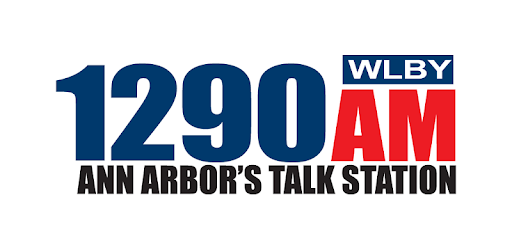
- Saline, Michigan; United States
- Broadcast area: Washtenaw County, Michigan
- Frequency: 1290 kHz
- Branding: AM 1290 WLBY

Programming
- Format: Talk
- Network: ABC News Radio; Bloomberg Radio
- Affiliations: Westwood One; CBS News Radio; Detroit Lions; Michigan Wolverines

Ownership
- Owner: Cumulus Media; (Cumulus Licensing LLC)
- Sister stations: WQKL, WTKA, WWWW-FM

History
- First air date: January 5, 1958; 68 years ago (as WOIA)
- Former call signs: WOIA (1958–1963); WOIB (1963–1970); WNRS (1970–1992); WIQB (1992–1993); WAMX (1993–1996); WDEO (1996–1999); WYBN (1999–2001); WCAS (2001–2002); WHNE (2002–2004)

Technical information
- Licensing authority: FCC
- Facility ID: 41081
- Class: D
- Power: 500 watts day 26 watts night
- Transmitter coordinates: 42°12′17″N 83°47′19″W

Links
- Public license information: Public file; LMS
- Webcast: Listen live
- Website: 1290wlby.com

WLBY (1290 AM) is a broadcast radio station in the United States. Licensed to Saline, Michigan, with offices in nearby Ann Arbor, the station has a talk format and serves surrounding Washtenaw County. WLBY is owned by Cumulus Media along with three other stations based in Ann Arbor.

The station first signed on in 1958 as WOIA and had music formats for much of its history, as late as the 2000s. After nearly four decades as a music station, in 1996 the station changed to a Catholic format leased by Domino's Pizza founder Tom Monaghan. Then from 1999 to 2001, the station broadcast business news. After two short-lived adult standards and oldies formats from 2001 to 2004, the station picked up its present call sign WLBY in 2004 and became a progressive talk radio station carrying the Air America Radio format. In 2009, WLBY returned to business news; the station picked up a more conventional talk format by 2012.

With hourly news updates provided by ABC News Radio, WLBY broadcasts a local morning show and nationally syndicated programs including The Dan Bongino Show, The Mark Levin Show, and the Bloomberg Radio network. Additionally, WLBY broadcasts University of Michigan women's basketball and is the secondary Ann Arbor affiliate of the Detroit Lions Radio Network.

== History ==
=== WOIA, WOIB and WNRS (1958–1992) ===
Founded by the Saline Broadcasting Company, the station first broadcast at 3 p.m. on January 5, 1958. WOIA broadcast with 500 watts of power as a daytimer. The studios were in Lodi Township. It had a full service format featuring news, educational interviews, and both popular and classical music. Sundays had an hour of German music.

In 1959, the Lester Broadcasting Corporation purchased WOIA from Saline Broadcasting. Beginning in 1962, WOIA gained an FM simulcast on 102.9, WOIA-FM. The AM call sign changed to WOIB on December 12, 1963.

In 1967, Lester Broadcasting sold WOIA/WOIB to the Felty Broadcasting Corporation for $180,000.

On February 14, 1970, both stations were re-branded as "The Winners", with the 1290 calls changed to WNRS and 102.9 to WNRZ. Initially the "Winners" retained the WOIA/WOIB Top 40 format but later switched to country; WNRZ-FM also played progressive rock for a time while the AM side continued with the country format.

In 1975, WNRZ-FM brought the "Winners" simulcast to an end when it changed to album oriented rock as WIQB. WNRS returned to its former country format in September 1978. In August 1979, station owner Radio-Ann Arbor Inc. announced the sale of WNRS and WIQB to Lake America Communications for a combined $1.24 million.

=== As WIQB, WAMX, WDEO, and WYBN (1992–2001) ===
WNRS became WIQB on February 21, 1992 and changed from oldies to new-age music as its former oldies format moved to new sister FM station WQKL.

On March 1, 1993, the station call sign changed from WIQB to WAMX. WAMX had an adult contemporary music format. In September 1994, American Media Management bought WAMX and WIQB-FM from Mediabase Research Corporation for $3.6 million.

On October 18, 1996, WAMX became WDEO. At the time, Domino's Pizza founder Tom Monaghan reached a local marketing agreement to change WDEO to a Catholic format branded Ave Maria Radio, sponsored by his Ave Maria Foundation. However, due to WDEO having a weak signal that did not reach the city of Detroit, Monaghan bought Ypsilanti, Michigan station WWCM, whose 9,200 watt daytime signal was more audible in Detroit, for $2.5 million in June that year. The WDEO call sign and programming would move to WWCM.

On October 1, 1999, WDEO changed its call sign to WYBN and format from religion to the Business Talk Radio Network. The "YBN" stood for "Your Business News". In May 2000, Clear Channel Communications acquired Cumulus' Ann Arbor stations, including WYBN.

=== Oldies formats as WCAS (2001–2004) ===
On March 5, 2001, WYBN changed to WCAS. On March 23, WCAS changed from business news to an adult standards format.

On June 28, 2002, WCAS changed an all-oldies format dubbed "Honey Radio", playing 1950s to 1970s oldies, a homage to the "Honey Radio" format on the old WHND in Monroe, Michigan. A week later on July 5, WCAS changed its call sign to WHNE.

=== Talk formats as WLBY (2004–present) ===
On August 23, 2004, WHNE changed to WLBY and began broadcasting Air America Radio, a progressive talk radio network. General manager Bob Bolak considered Air America a potentially successful format considering what he called "the liberal mood of Ann Arbor" in addition to a goal to attract younger listeners.

Although WLBY attracted a 2.2 ratings share in the fall 2004 Arbitron ratings, the share declined to 0.9 in spring 2005, a decline that a Clear Channel station manager attributed to interest in political talk declining after the 2004 United States presidential election. Beginning in the 2004–05 season, WLBY broadcast select University of Michigan women's basketball games.

WLBY improved to a 1.2 share in spring 2006. In mid-November 2006, nearly a week after statewide elections, WLBY temporarily dropped Air America to stunt with content related to University of Michigan sports, namely a loop of Michigan's fight song "The Victors", highlights of classic football games, and sports updates.

In December 2006, Cumulus reacquired Clear Channel's Ann Arbor stations, including WLBY, as part of a multi-station swap.

By fall 2007, WLBY's ratings declined to 0.6.

Beginning in 2008, WLBY became the Ann Arbor affiliate of the Michigan State Spartans football radio network. WLBY added Michigan State Spartans men's basketball games in the 2009–10 season.

WLBY had a programming overhaul in 2009. WAAM host Lucy Ann Lance moved her daily talk show on WLBY on January 24, 2009, a year after being laid off from WAAM. Then on March 16, WLBY switched to a business talk format, featuring Lance's morning show and nationally syndicated programs including financial advice The Dave Ramsey Show, consumer advice The Clark Howard Show, and programming from the Business Talk Radio Network. WLBY previously broadcast the Business Talk Radio Network in 1999 as WYBN. WLBY's new slogan was "Ann Arbor's Business Talk Radio". By 2010, WLBY's regular programming was limited to Lance, Ramsey, Howard, and the Bloomberg Radio network.

By spring 2012, WLBY added news and sports talk to its regular schedule, including The Mike Huckabee Show and The Huge Show. WLBY changed its slogan to "Ann Arbor's Talk Station" around July 2012.

In 2015, WLBY joined the Detroit Lions Radio Network.

WLBY phased out Michigan State sports broadcasts in the 2020s; the final season with Michigan State men's basketball was in 2019–20. Following the 2023 season, WLBY dropped Michigan State football games after 16 seasons.

== Programming ==
Weekday programs include the local Lucy Ann Lance Show and nationally syndicated talk shows, such as The Dan Bongino Show and The Mark Levin Show from Westwood One and CBS Eye on the World with John Batchelor. WLBY simulcasts the Bloomberg Radio network on overnight hours and weekends. Most hours begin with ABC News Radio bulletins.

WLBY also broadcasts local sports. As a member of the Michigan Sports Network, WLBY broadcasts Michigan Wolverines women's basketball games. WLBY is also the secondary Ann Arbor affiliate of the Detroit Lions Radio Network in case of a scheduling conflict for WTKA.

== Technical information ==
WLBY is powered at 500 watts by day and 26 watts at night, using a directional antenna with a two-tower array. The transmitter is in Saline. The studios are at Victors Way in southern Ann Arbor, near Interstate 94 and State Street.
