= WMUZ (AM) =

- Taylor, Michigan; United States
- Broadcast area: Metro Detroit
- Frequency: 1200 kHz (HD Radio)
- Branding: WMUZ The Salt 1200 AM

Programming
- Format: Christian talk and teaching

Ownership
- Owner: Crawford Broadcasting; (WMUZ Radio, Inc.)
- Sister stations: WMUZ-FM, WCHB, WRDT

History
- First air date: February 22, 1990; 36 years ago
- Former call signs: WCHB (1990–2017)
- Call sign meaning: Taken from sister station WMUZ-FM (103.5)

Technical information
- Licensing authority: FCC
- Facility ID: 4598
- Class: B
- Power: 50,000 watts day 15,000 watts night
- Transmitter coordinates: 42°09′24″N 83°19′56″W

Links
- Public license information: Public file; LMS
- Webcast: Listen Live
- Website: wmuzam1200.com

WMUZ (1200 kHz) is a commercial AM radio station licensed to Taylor, Michigan, and serving the Metro Detroit radio market. Owned by Crawford Broadcasting, the station has a Christian talk and teaching format. Religious hosts heard on WMUZ include David Jeremiah, Joyce Meyer, Alistair Begg, Chuck Swindoll and Adrian Rogers. The studios and offices are located near Burt Road and Capitol Avenue in the Weatherby section of Detroit.

By day, WMUZ is powered at 50,000 watts, the maximum for commercial American AM stations. During daytime hours, it uses a four-tower array as part of its directional antenna. Because 1200 AM is a clear-channel frequency reserved for Class A station WOAI in San Antonio, WMUZ reduces power at night to 15,000 watts, using a ten-tower array, to avoid interference. The transmitter is on Middlebelt Road at King Road in Huron Township.

== History ==
=== AM 1440 WCHB ===
In 1956, WCHB signed on as a 1,000-watt daytimer at 1440 AM. It was originally licensed to Inkster, Michigan. The call letters stood for Dr. Wendell Cox and Dr. Haley Bell, who owned and operated the station under the Bell Broadcasting banner.

WCHB was one of the earliest radio station in the United States to be built from the ground up by black owners. It featured an R&B format, and quickly became a visible presence in Detroit's African-American community. Early on, WCHB aimed to be an all-purpose full-service station for the community, featuring not only R&B hits, but also urban gospel music, jazz, talk shows, and even a "Tweeny Time" show for two-to-six-year-olds. By the late 1960s, however, the popularity of the Motown sound, in addition to competition from WJLB (then an AM station at 1400 on the dial, now WDTK) and FM upstart WGPR, led WCHB to adopt a more Top 40-style presentation to the soul music format. In 1960, Bell Broadcasting signed on an FM sister station, WCHD, which later changed its call sign to WJZZ, becoming Detroit's most popular jazz station. (WCHD is now WDMK.)

WCHB experimented with a disco music format for a time during the late 1970s. However, WCHB saw its ratings sink during the 1980s as FM urban contemporary stations like WJLB (which moved its format from the AM to the FM dial in 1980) and WDRQ grabbed much of its audience. The station eventually returned to its roots of being a full-service voice for the African-American community, adding more talk shows, gospel music, news and sports, while reducing its R&B music shows.

=== AM 1200 WCHB ===
Bell Broadcasting moved the WCHB call letters to 1200 kHz in February 1990 as a new AM station for the Metro Detroit area. (AM 1440 became an all-gospel station as WMKM, under different ownership.)

In 1998, Bell Broadcasting sold WCHB and WCHB-FM (formerly WJZZ, later WDTJ and now WDMK) to Radio One, a black-owned broadcasting company. Radio One then set about the process of upgrading WCHB's signal, which involved taking the station off the air for several months in August 1998 to upgrade the equipment. The company purchased WKNX in Frankenmuth (at 1210 AM) and moved it to Kingsley, near Traverse City in northern Michigan (see also WLDR and WWMN), to improve WCHB's signal. Another occurrence which played a role was the nighttime reduction in power of first-adjacent channel WOWO in Fort Wayne, Indiana (at 1190 AM). WOWO also directionalized its nighttime signal towards the west and became a Class B station (formerly a Class A, clear channel with good nighttime coverage of Metro Detroit). That change of the WOWO signal at least partially allowed WCHB to increase nighttime power to 15,000 watts from 700 watts.

WCHB resurfaced in March 1999 with a new 50,000-watt daytime/15,000-watt nighttime signal and with a format of mainly gospel music, with a morning talk show, "Inside Detroit," hosted by outspoken Detroit personality and former WJLB newscaster Mildred Gaddis.

=== NewsTalk 1200 WCHB ===
In April 2005, WCHB cut back its gospel programming to 9 p.m. to 6 a.m. weekdays and around the clock on weekends to make way for Radio One's syndicated talk show lineup. Beginning on January 30, 2006, Radio One debuted Syndication One, a joint venture of Radio One and REACH Media, which featured urban talk show hosts Reverend Al Sharpton, Michael Eric Dyson and Doug & Ryan Stewart – the 2 Live Stews sports show. Mildred Gaddis' "Inside Detroit" remained a part of the schedule, airing from 6-10 a.m. weekdays. Another local show, "Your Voice with Angelo Henderson," hosted by Wall Street Journal columnist Angelo Henderson, also aired weekdays from 10 a.m.-1 p.m.

The shows were simultaneously placed on other Radio One stations, including WILD in Boston, WOL in Washington, D.C., WVCG in Miami, WERE in Cleveland and WROU in Richmond, Virginia. Cox Radio's Birmingham station, WPSB, also picked up each of the shows.

In March 2007, Michael Eric Dyson left Syndication One. He was replaced by The Warren Ballentine Show, hosted by attorney Warren Ballentine, who refers himself as The People's Attorney and radio Truth Fighter.

On April 30, 2007, WCHB welcomed "Parker & the Man" to the weekly line-up. The show was hosted by sports journalist Rob Parker and broadcaster Mark Wilson. Parker is a columnist for The Detroit News and a regular contributor on ESPN2's First Take. Wilson is a former Associated Press and Michigan Association of Broadcasters' "Michigan Sportscaster of the Year." Parker & the Man, who were previously heard on Detroit FM station Live 97.1 WKRK, initially ran from 9 p.m-12 a.m. They were consistently among the top shows with men 25-54 while at WKRK, which is now known as "97.1 The Ticket."

In the fall of 2007, after the 2 Live Stews syndication deal was not renewed by Syndication One, Parker & the Man shifted to 4-7 p.m. In June 2008, Parker and The Man was dropped from the station.

=== Gospel goes full time on AM 1200 ===
On June 9, 2008, at 10 a.m., News-Talk AM 1200 flipped formats to a full-time urban gospel music station. Of its News-talk line-up, only morning host Mildred Gaddis remained with the station, continuing her morning drive time show. She was the only live host on the station. After her show, the station became automated. WCHB was known as "AM 1200 WCHB, Mildred In The Morning and Inspiration All Day."

=== Return of NewsTalk 1200 ===
In 2009, WCHB reimaged itself as a News/Talk station again after failing to attract listeners with its Gospel format. (The format was later relaunched in October 2011, this time on sister station WHTD.) Gaddis remained in mornings, followed by Henderson, the syndicated Al Shapton, Ramona Prater's "F Club Radio Show" (a program geared towards a female audience), and Gayle King. Both Gaddis and Sharpton's shows were repeated after 8PM on weekdays.

On October 15, 2011, WCHB moved an FM repeater station, W206BI, from 89.1 to 99.9 FM (becoming W260CB) and began testing on that frequency. W206BI/W260CB was a translator of Toledo's National Public Radio affiliate, WGTE-FM, owned by the Bell Broadcasting Company (headed by Haley Bell, former co-owner of WCHB). It was licensed to Hamtramck at 89.1 FM, with an application to move up to 99.9 and repeat WDMK-FM. W260CB is now on the air permanently. Technically, the station repeats WDMK-HD2, which was a slightly delayed simulcast of WCHB. W260CB broadcasts with a power of 250 watts and an antenna of 245 meters.

During the summer of 2012, WCHB added smooth jazz programming during the late evening and overnight hours, restoring the format to the Detroit area on a part-time basis. Programming was from Broadcast Architecture's Smooth Jazz Network.

=== Crawford Broadcasting ownership ===
On April 12, 2017, Radio One announced that WCHB would be sold to Crawford Broadcasting. At the same time, the company also stated that much of WCHB's programming will move to WPZR. Also with the sale, translator W260CB was retained by Radio One, simulcasting WDMK's HD2 digital subchannel. It originally aired a classic soul format as "Soul 99.9"; it has since switched to Urban Gospel.

On August 3, 2017, WCHB went silent after the sale of the station to Crawford was completed. On October 1, 2017, WCHB changed call letters to WMUZ. The WCHB call letters were moved to 1340 AM, formerly WEXL.

According to a Crawford Broadcasting engineering newsletter, WCHB was undergoing upgrades, and was set to return to the air on November 1, 2017. At the time of the relaunch, the station flipped to Christian talk and teaching programming as "The Salt". It began running brokered religious shows, where hosts buy time on the station and may request donations on the air to support their ministries.

Spanish programming

On April 1, 2025, Christian sermons debuted Monday through Friday 7pm-midnight translated in English and Spanish on WMUZ.

== See also ==
- Media in Detroit
