= WDJC-FM =

Radio station in Birmingham, Alabama

Coordinates: 33.443°N 86.881°W

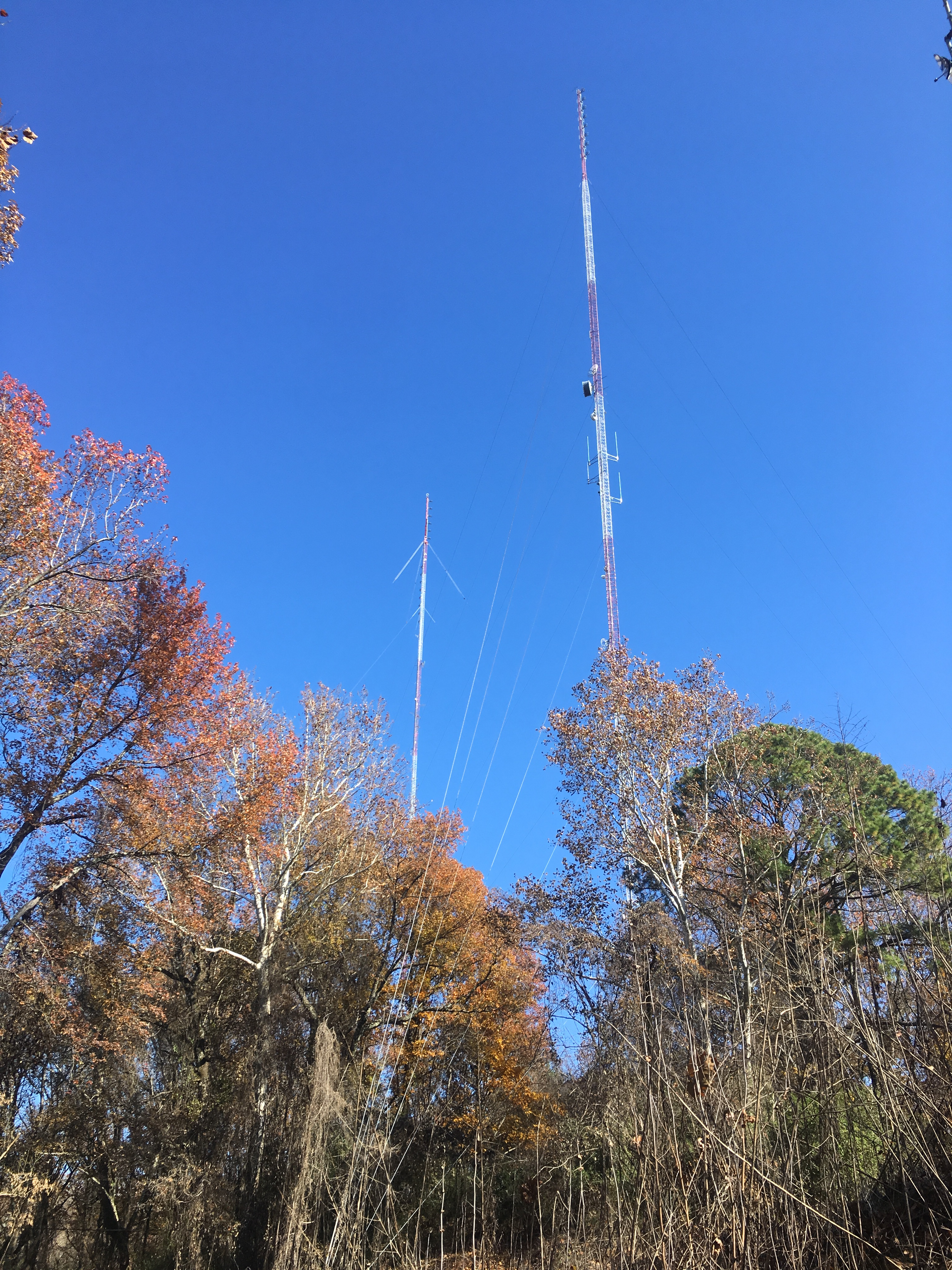
- Transmitter towers, including one for WDJC-FM, November 2019
- Birmingham, Alabama; United States
- Broadcast area: North-central Alabama
- Frequency: 93.7 MHz (HD Radio)
- Branding: 93.7 WDJC

Programming
- Format: Contemporary Christian
- Subchannels: HD2: Southern gospel (WXJC-FM); HD3: Christian radio (WYDE)

Ownership
- Owner: Crawford Broadcasting Company; (Kimtron, Inc.)
- Sister stations: WXJC-FM; WYDE; WYDE-FM

History
- First air date: May 11, 1958
- Former call signs: WSFM (1958–1967; WDJC (1967–1978)
- Call sign meaning: Witness Daily for Jesus Christ or Donald J. Crawford, president of Crawford Broadcasting Company

Technical information
- Licensing authority: FCC
- Facility ID: 34819
- Class: C0
- ERP: 100,000 watts
- HAAT: 307 meters (1,007 ft)
- Repeater: 101.1 WXJC-FM HD2 (Cullman)

Links
- Public license information: Public file; LMS
- Webcast: Listen live
- Website: www.wdjconline.com

WDJC-FM (93.7 MHz) is a radio station licensed to Birmingham, Alabama, and owned by Crawford Broadcasting. It was one of the first commercial FM stations in the United States to exclusively feature Christian radio programming. Today the station programs Contemporary Christian music. The studios are on Summit Parkway in Homewood.

WDJC-FM is a Class C0 FM station. It has an effective radiated power (ERP) of 100,000 watts, the maximum for most stations. The transmitter tower is off Venice Road in Southwest Birmingham.

== History ==
=== WSGN-FM ===
An FM station started broadcasting at 93.7 FM in December 21, 1947, using the call sign WSGN-FM. It was owned by the parent company of The Birmingham News. WSGN-FM was the sister station of WSGN (610 AM), one of the more popular AM radio stations in Birmingham. WSGN-FM was the first FM station to broadcast in Alabama.

In 1953, the parent company of The News purchased WAFM-TV, WAPI and WAFM-FM and was forced to spin off WSGN-AM-FM. They were sold to Jemison Broadcasting Company and then to Winston-Salem Broadcasting Company. Few people owned FM receivers in those days. The FM station was not profitable and it was shut down in 1955.

=== WSFM ===
On a new license, James Melonas built another station at 93.7 FM in the late 1950s. It signed on the air on May 11, 1958. This station bore the call letters WSFM and featured a classical music format.

In 1967, Melonas, who struggled through most of his ownership to get advertisers to sponsor classical music programming, sold the frequency to Crawford Broadcasting Company and the station went off the air on October 1966. With its new call letters, WDJC, the station changed formats and began broadcasting Christian programming on April 22, 1968. Initially, the programming consisted of Bible studies, church services and other Christian teaching; by the mid-1970s, some contemporary Christian music was added to the programming mix (it is believed that only Huntsville's now-defunct WNDA—now WRTT-FM—was the only other station in the state to do so at the time). At about the same time, a nightly program featuring Southern gospel music, the Dixie Gospel Caravan, was added. This programming strategy continued well into the 1990s.

=== WDJC-FM ===
After an AM sister station was named WDJC, this station was assigned the WDJC-FM call letters by the Federal Communications Commission on December 4, 1978. On December 1, 1981, the station resumed its former WDJC call letters. The station was reassigned the current WDJC-FM call letters by the Federal Communications Commission on June 3, 1994.

In 1998, WDJC-FM dropped the non-music elements of its programming. WFMH-FM in Cullman was purchased by a group of Birmingham investors with the purpose of launching a station that would play contemporary Christian music 24 hours a day, seven days a week. Initially, the new station, rebranded as WRRS-FM proved to be a challenger to WDJC-FM; in reaction to the challenge, WDJC-FM began to play contemporary Christian music exclusively. Within three years, WRRS changed formats; Crawford Broadcasting bought the competing station in 2003 and changed its format to talk radio.

WDJC-FM HD3 carried "99.1 The Game" (NBC Sports Radio) until November 10, 2017. That programming was simulcast on W256CD (99.1 FM).
