= WYDE-FM =

Radio station in Cordova, Alabama

Currently silent
- Cordova, Alabama; United States
- Broadcast area: Greater Birmingham
- Frequency: 92.5 MHz (HD Radio)
- Branding: Alabama's God and Country Station

Programming
- Format: Conservative talk; Christian radio

Ownership
- Owner: Crawford Broadcasting; (Kimtron, Inc.)
- Sister stations: WDJC-FM; WXJC-FM; WYDE

History
- First air date: 1997
- Former call signs: WZJT (1997–2000); WQOP-FM (2000-04); WXJC-FM (2004–2006, 2007–2018); WPHC (2006–2007)

Technical information
- Licensing authority: FCC
- Facility ID: 74245
- Class: A
- ERP: 2,200 watts
- HAAT: 167 meters (548 ft)
- Transmitter coordinates: 33°38′55″N 87°9′19″W

Links
- Public license information: Public file; LMS
- Webcast: Listen live
- Website: wyderadio.com

WYDE-FM (92.5 FM) is a commercial radio station licensed to Cordova, Alabama, United States, and serving Greater Birmingham. To compensate for its weak signal over the eastern and southern parts of the Birmingham metropolitan area, WYDE-FM simulcasts with sister station WYDE (1260 AM). The station is owned by Crawford Broadcasting with the licensed held by Kimtron, Inc. Until going silent in 2026, WYDE-AM-FM aired a format of conservative talk and Christian talk and teaching. The offices and studios are on Summit Parkway at West Valley Avenue in Homewood.

WYDE-FM's transmitter is along Alabama State Route 269, in southeastern Walker County near the border with Jefferson County, about 25 miles (40 km) northwest of downtown Birmingham.

== History ==
=== Top 40 and active rock ===
The station signed on the air in 1997. It was a Top 40 station with the call letters WZJT, calling itself "Party Radio Z-92.5". It was put on the air by the owner and operator of a nightclub in Birmingham, Alabama. At the time, there were no other Top 40 music stations on the Birmingham dial. But the location of the station's transmitter and its weak signal proved to be a hindrance to successful Arbitron ratings.

Within a few months of its debut, WZJT changed formats and became an active rock station with the new on-air name of "Planet Rock 92-5". The new format was no more successful in attracting listeners than its previous incarnation.

=== Catholic Radio and Country ===
In 2000, the station was sold and became an affiliate of EWTN’s Catholic radio network. The station's call letters were changed to WQOP-FM (Queen of Peace, referring to the Virgin Mary). EWTN is based in Irondale, Alabama, outside Birmingham.

In 2004, Crawford Broadcasting Company bought the station in order to establish an FM simulcast partner of WDJC (850 AM). After the acquisition, the call letters of the AM and FM stations were changed to WXJC and WXJC-FM. The stations offered a combination of Southern gospel music and nationally syndicated Christian talk and teaching programs.

In May 2006, WXJC-FM changed its call letters to WPHC. It flipped to a country music format. With other country stations such as WDXB and WZZK-FM already established in Birmingham and Tuscaloosa’s WTXT and WFFN serving its primary broadcast area, WPHC failed to attract significant listenership. The country sounds only lasted five months.

=== Christian talk ===
In October of the same year, WPHC returned to a format of Christian talk and teaching. WPHC changed its call letters back to WXJC-FM on July 9, 2007.

On November 5, 2018, 92.5 FM switched its call sign to WYDE-FM. The previous WXJC-FM call letters were assigned to co-owned 101.1 FM in Cullman. That station, along with WXJC AM, simulcast all Christian talk and teaching programs, while WYDE-FM 92.5 and WYDE (1260 AM) simulcast a different format of conservative talk and Christian talk.

On March 1, 2026, WYDE-FM ceased operations.

== See also ==
- List of radio stations in Alabama
