= WYDE (AM) =

Coordinates: 33°31′29″N 86°47′10″W

Currently silent
- Birmingham, Alabama; United States
- Broadcast area: Greater Birmingham
- Frequency: 1260 kHz (HD Radio)
- Branding: Alabama's God and Country Station

Programming
- Format: Conservative talk; Christian radio
- Affiliations: Motor Racing Network

Ownership
- Owner: Crawford Broadcasting
- Sister stations: WDJC-FM; WXJC-FM; WYDE-FM

History
- First air date: March 25, 1953 (as WCRT)
- Former call signs: WCRT (1953–1991); WCEO (1991–1994); WDJC (1994–1999); WLGS (1999–2003); WYDE (2003–2006); WLGD (2006–2007)

Technical information
- Licensing authority: FCC
- Facility ID: 34822
- Class: D
- Power: 5,000 watts (day); 41 watts (night)
- Translator: 95.3 W237EK (Birmingham)
- Repeaters: 92.5 WYDE-FM (Cordova); 93.7 WDJC-FM HD3 (Birmingham)

Links
- Public license information: Public file; LMS
- Webcast: Listen live
- Website: wyderadio.com

WYDE (1260 AM) is a commercial radio station in Birmingham, Alabama that is currently silent. It is owned by the Crawford Broadcasting Company. Prior to ceasing broadcasting it aired a talk format with some Christian talk and teaching and southern gospel programs. It was simulcast with WYDE-FM 92.5 MHz in Cordova, which went silent at the same time. The studios are on Summit Parkway at West Valley Avenue.

The transmitter site is on 2nd Avenue North at 35th Street South in Birmingham. By day, it transmits with 5,000 watts, but at night, to avoid interfering with other stations on AM 1260, it greatly reduces power to 41 watts. Programming was also heard on FM translator W237EK (95.3 FM) and on WDJC-FM-HD4.

WYDE broadcast in the HD Radio format. It converted to digital-only transmissions on September 1, 2023, but switched back to hybrid (analog plus digital) in June 2025.

== History ==
=== MOR and Music of Your Life ===
The station signed on the air on March 25, 1953. Its original call sign was WCRT, carrying a middle of the road (MOR) format with news updates from the Mutual Broadcasting System (MBS). Due to Federal Communications Commission (FCC) restrictions, WCRT was a daytimer and was required to sign off at sunset.

The owners of WCRT were also instrumental in the launch of WCFT-TV in Tuscaloosa; hence the similarity in the call signs. In 1961, WCRT launched a companion FM station. Initially, WCRT-FM 96.5 was a simulcast of its AM partner. In the 1970s the FM station relaunched as easy listening WQEZ. Today that station is heritage adult contemporary station WMJJ.

During the 1970s, WCRT was an adult standards station that used the nationally syndicated "Music of Your Life" radio service. In 1982, sister station WQEZ-FM was sold, and by 1983, the owners of WCRT were looking to get out of the radio business. Later that year, the station was sold to a group of Christian businessmen who planned to drop adult standards in favor of contemporary Christian music. Before the sales transaction could be completed, a fire destroyed the station’s studios and offices, and WCRT was forced off the air for several months.

=== Christian contemporary and pldies ===
In August 1983, WCRT returned with the new on-air name "Love 1260" and the new contemporary Christian music format. A weak signal that did not reach the suburbs at night, the waning popularity of AM radio, and competition from WDJC-FM were among several reasons why Love 1260 was not particularly successful. Less than three years later, Love 1260 dropped contemporary Christian music in favor of a secular adult contemporary music format.

In 1986, WCRT dropped AC music in favor of an all-oldies format. It played the hits of the 1950s and 1960s until 1991, when it dropped music programming in favor of an all business news format and new call letters WCEO. The business news format continued until 1994, when Crawford Broadcasting Company, the owners of WDJC-FM, bought the station and launched a Christian country music format on the station, which was relaunched as WDJC. Later in the 1990s, the station changed formats again, this time to urban gospel music, placing it in direct competition with format leader WAGG and several other stations. In late 1997 this format was dropped and the on air moniker "Radio Bible University" was adopted. The station was brokered Christian talk and teaching programs, along with some local talk shows. The "Dixie Gospel Caravan with Wayne Wallace" was rebroadcast from sister station WDJC-FM every evening on WDJC AM.

=== Legends 1260 ===
In 1999, 1260 AM ended most of the Christian programming. The station once again became an adult standards station, WLGS "Legends 1260". The station achieved moderate ratings success. By 2001, WLGS added some oldies music to its playlist. By 2002, it had segued into a full-time oldies station, playing 1960s and 1970s hits. In 2003, the station dropped the oldies format and became a full-time simulcast partner of WYDE-FM 101.1, rebroadcasting the FM station's conservative talk radio format. The simulcast continued for the next three years.

In October 2006, WYDE changed its call letters to WLGD. Once again, the station was known on the air as "Legends 1260" and was an adult standards station, focusing primarily on vocal music from the 1950s, 1960s and 1970s. Long-time Birmingham radio veterans Burt and Kurt, formerly of WSGN, WMJJ and WODL, headlined the new station's morning show.

=== Simulcasting WYDE-FM ===
In July 2007, the station changed its call letters once again. It went back to WYDE and began simulcasting the new classic hits format of WYDE-FM with Burt and Kurt in the morning drive spot.

The classic hits format was dropped in early 2009 for a return to talk radio with some Christian talk and teaching programs and southern gospel music.

On March 1, 2026, WYDE ceased operations. By this point, the origination of the simulcast had shifted to WYDE-FM 92.5.

== See also ==
- List of radio stations in Alabama
