= WXJC-FM =

Radio station in Cullman, Alabama

- Cullman, Alabama; United States
- Broadcast area: Greater Birmingham; North-Central Alabama
- Frequency: 101.1 MHz (HD Radio)
- Branding: Truth 101.1

Programming
- Format: Christian radio
- Affiliations: Motor Racing Network

Ownership
- Owner: Crawford Broadcasting; (Kimtron, Inc.)
- Sister stations: WDJC-FM; WYDE-FM; WYDE

History
- First air date: 1950
- Former call signs: WFMH-FM (1949–1998); WRRS (1998–2002); WYDE-FM (2002–2018)

Technical information
- Licensing authority: FCC
- Facility ID: 70452
- Class: C0
- ERP: 100,000 watts
- HAAT: 410 meters (1,350 ft)
- Transmitter coordinates: 34°4′56″N 86°54′15″W

Links
- Public license information: Public file; LMS
- Webcast: Listen live
- Website: www.wxjcradio.com

WXJC-FM (101.1 MHz, "Truth 101.1") is a commercial radio station licensed to Cullman, Alabama, serving Greater Birmingham and most of north-central Alabama. It is owned by Crawford Broadcasting Company. WXJC-FM broadcasts a format of Christian talk and teaching programs with southern gospel and worship music. The studios are on Summit Parkway at West Valley Avenue in Birmingham.

WXJC-FM's transmitter is sited in Good Hope, Alabama, near the border between Cullman County and Blount County, approximately 40 miles (64 km) north of downtown Birmingham. The signal provides at least secondary coverage to Huntsville, Tuscaloosa, Gadsden and Florence.

== History ==
=== WFMH-FM ===
The station signed on in 1950. The original call sign was WFMH-FM, at 100.9 MHz. It was the FM counterpart to AM 1300 WFMH (now dark). It was only powered at 430 watts, a fraction of its current output. WFMH-AM-FM were owned by a company known as The Voice of Cullman. A few years later, WFMH-FM moved to 101.1 MHz, coupled with an increase in power to 5,300 watts.

Before it began targeting the Birmingham market, WFMH-FM had several different formats, including classic country music and adult standards. In 1998 Eddins Broadcasting Co. sold it to a group of businessmen in Birmingham. Eddins moved WFMH to the 95.5 frequency in Holly Pond. The owners purchased the station with the intent of launching a second Contemporary Christian music station in Birmingham. Competing against WDJC-FM, the station was rebranded as Reality 101.1 with the new call letters WRRS (for "Reality Radio Station").

Initially, Reality 101.1 proved to be moderately successful, but the location of the station's broadcast tower hindered the signal from adequately reaching the southern suburbs of Birmingham. Also, in reaction to the presence of WRRS in the market, WDJC dropped all of its Christian teaching programming as well as its nighttime Southern gospel music program and became a full-time contemporary Christian music station. Faced with bankruptcy, the station was sold for $9 million to STG Media LLC, an ownership group that held several stations in the Huntsville market, and the station changed music formats, becoming a modern rock/adult contemporary hybrid station known on the air as "101.1 the Spot". "The Spot" was no more successful in the Birmingham market than its predecessor, and the ownership of the station began looking for an opportunity to sell the station.

=== WYDE ===
Crawford Broadcasting purchased WMKI (850 AM) in 1999 and re-launched the former affiliate of Radio Disney as a talk radio station. It reacquired its heritage call letters, WYDE. The new WYDE established itself as a leader in conservative talk, due in part to morning hosts Russ and Dee Fine. However, the station's reduced nighttime signal limited its coverage area.

In 2002, Crawford, which was looking to expand the listening area of WYDE, purchased WRRS-FM for $8.5 million. Crawford temporarily took the station off the air in order to upgrade its transmitter.

=== FM talk ===
In August of that year, 101.1 FM returned to the air as Birmingham's first FM talk station as WYDE-FM. At first, both WYDE-FM and AM were full-time simulcast partners, but by the fall, the AM station changed its call letters to WDJC. The call letters of AM 850 were changed, this time to WXJC, when Crawford Broadcasting acquired an FM station that it used to simulcast the AM station's programming. It became a full-time Christian station, featuring syndicated Bible studies and teaching along with Southern gospel music.

In 2003, WYDE-FM began simulcasting its programming on co-owned WLGS (1260 AM), which formerly had been an oldies/adult standards station. The call letters of the AM station were changed to WYDE. That simulcast continued until September 2006, when the AM station was taken off the air in preparation for its relaunch as an adult standards station. The new call letters of the AM station were WLGD.

On June 27, 2007, weekend paid programming host David Billings of the "Home 101 Program" announced on his website that the station would be dropping its FM talk format.

=== Oldies and AC ===
On July 2, 2007, WYDE-FM dropped all talk shows, and began stunting with Christmas music, in a "Christmas in July" promotion, simulcasting with WLGD. At 12:00 a.m. on July 5, the station debuted "The New WYDE 101.1", with an oldies-based adult contemporary format. As part of the format switch, the AM station WLGD again changed its call letters to WYDE.

On October 17, 2008, Crawford Broadcasting informed the staff that they would be released. WYDE-FM would be dropping its adult contemporary format soon. WYDE-FM spent several months of continuing playing music with no live studio announcers.

=== Return to talk ===
The station reverted to talk radio in January 2009. Again known as "101.1 The Source", WYDE-FM aired "America's Morning News" plus Laura Ingraham, Dennis Miller, Dave Ramsey, Rusty Humphries, and Dr. Asa's syndicated shows. Local shows include "The Michael Hart Show" weekday afternoons,"The Lee Davis Show" middays, and another local show from 7 to 9pm, "The Steve West Show".

There were several local weekend shows as well. They include "Shop Talk with Jim Moore", and "Your House Inside and Out".

On February 18, 2013, WYDE-FM rebranded as "Superstation 101 WYDE" with a revamped lineup, including new program director Leland Whaley in afternoons, previous afternoon host Michael Hart in mornings and Dave Ramsey in the early afternoons.

As of October 2015, the station's weekday lineup had changed. Whaley was still hosting an afternoon show and Ramsey's show was still featured, but Hart was moved to nighttime from 7 to 9 p.m. Former Birmingham television news anchor Andrea Lindenberg hosted a show from 9 to 11 a.m., followed by the syndicated "Yellowhammer Radio" program hosted by Cliff Sims, publisher of the conservative blog Yellowhammer News, from 11 a.m. to 1 p.m. In 2017, Lindenberg left the station to join Matt Murphy on WZRR, and Yellowhammer Radio co-host Scott Beason took over the time slot. After Cliff Sims took his new position at the White House, Ford Brown, took over from 12–3.

=== Religion and southern gospel ===
On November 5, 2018, WYDE-FM changed its format from talk to a mix of southern gospel music and Christian talk and teaching, under new WXJC-FM call letters. The format and call sign moved to 101.1 from 92.5 FM in Cordova. That station, in turn, switched to talk and inspirational music using the WYDE-FM call letters.
