= Percy Crawford =

American evangelist (1902–1960)

Percy Bartimus Crawford (October 20, 1902 – October 31, 1960) was an evangelist and fundamentalist leader who especially emphasized youth ministry. During the late 1950s, he saw the potential of FM radio and UHF television and built the first successful Christian broadcasting network. He also founded The King's College and Pinebrook, a Bible conference in the Pocono Mountains.

== Youth and conversion ==
Crawford was born in Minnedosa, Manitoba, Canada, and was reared in Vancouver, British Columbia. He dropped out of school to help support the family after his father left his mother and their three children.

As a teenager, he left home and completed high school at the YMCA school in Portland, Oregon. Preparing to enter the University of California at Los Angeles, he was converted to Christianity on September 23, 1923, at Reuben Torrey's Church of the Open Door, under the preaching of itinerant evangelist W. P. Nicholson.

== Education ==
In 1924 he enrolled at the Bible Institute of Los Angeles (BIOLA), where he was mentored by Thomas Corwin Horton and Reuben Torrey. At BIOLA Crawford discovered his gift for evangelism and committed himself to full-time Christian service. After briefly studying at UCLA, Crawford earned a bachelor's degree at Wheaton College. During summer months of his student years, he made successful evangelistic tours with a gospel quartet, in one summer recording eight hundred professions of faith in Christ.

In 1931, while a seminarian at Westminster Theological Seminary he started his own youth-oriented radio program on a single station in Philadelphia, calling it the "Young People’s Church of the Air." Within a decade he had built a radio ministry that aired on over 400 stations and included evangelistic "fishing clubs," a bookstore, and book clubs. After being ordained by the Presbyterian church, he also briefly pastored the Rhawnhurst Presbyterian Church in northeast Philadelphia. Siding with J. Gresham Machen and the fundamentalists in the Presbyterian church, he resigned from the Presbytery of Philadelphia—but "without fanfare or publicity."

== Marriage ==
In 1931, he met and, two years later, married a very young but gifted pianist and arranger from Collingswood, New Jersey, Ruth Duvall, who became his lifelong partner in evangelism. Ruth Crawford assembled a musical entourage—vocal quartet, brass quartet, men's and women's ensembles, and later a full orchestra—that distinguished Crawford's evangelistic ministry from others of his era. The Crawfords had five children, four sons and a daughter.

== Ministries ==
In 1929 Crawford began speaking on radio station WPEN, Philadelphia for the Sunday Breakfast Rescue Mission, a homeless shelter and soup kitchen, which recorded its Sunday morning service before hundreds of homeless men. In October 1931, he started his own radio ministry called the Young People's Church of the Air, and within a decade the program was broadcast on four hundred stations.

In 1933 Crawford founded Pinebrook Bible Conference for young people and brought to it the nation's leading fundamentalist Bible teachers and musicians. A few years later he added Shadowbrook camp for boys and Mountainbrook camp for girls. Crawford directed Pinebrook for nearly 28 years.

In 1936, he founded The King's College, a Christian liberal arts college. The institution began in Belmar, New Jersey, relocated to New Castle, Delaware in 1941, and then to Briarcliff Manor, New York in 1955. Crawford served as president for 23 years. Although he was very much the dominant personality, he was frequently absent conducting his other ministries, and his "autocratic style" limited the long-term effectiveness of the college.

Crawford and his wife often traveled 40 to 50,000 miles a year with a quartet, and later their five children, conducting meetings and rallies mainly in the northeast but also on cross-country tours to the west coast. In 1953–54, the evangelistic team made an 18-week world tour that included three weeks in Korea preaching to American servicemen. The Crawfords typically used upbeat, easy-to-learn choruses in their services, and the Young People's Church of the Air eventually published thirteen books of gospel songs. Although Crawford remained a staunch foe of religious Modernism and the social gospel, he also increased his audience appeal by avoiding controversy in his preaching and rarely making personal attacks.

In 1949, Crawford began the first coast-to-coast religious program, Youth on the March. This show aired on the ABC network, moving to the DuMont network for 1952–53. In 1956 Crawford organized a novel youth rally format in Philadelphia's Town Hall, which he called "Youtharama." The program emphasized large-scale musical productions with chorus and orchestra, humorous skits, and high-profile youth-oriented guest speakers who gave Christian testimonies before Crawford closed the meeting with an invitation and altar call. In 1958 Crawford organized a Christian Broadcasting Network (not to be confused with the Pat Robertson-owned network of the same name) that eventually included six radio stations and one television station—although with mounting debts. Crawford and the Young People's Church of the Air also began operating the Philadelphia UHF television station WPCA (today WPHL) on July 17, 1960, the world's first religious television station.

== Death ==
Crawford died on October 31, 1960, of a heart attack suffered while driving to a Youth for Christ evangelistic meeting in Lancaster, Pennsylvania. Billy Graham was the main speaker at his funeral.

== Bibliography ==
- Bahr, Robert. Man With a Vision: The Story of Percy Crawford. Chicago: Moody Press, n.d. [approx. 1961].
- Carpenter, Joel A. Revive Us Again: The Reawakening of American Fundamentalism. New York: Oxford University Press, 1997, ch. 9.
- Crawford, Dan D. (2010), A Thirst for Souls: the Life of Evangelist Percy B. Crawford (1902-1960), Selinsgrove, PA: Susquehanna University Press, ISBN 978-1-57591-140-3.
- Crawford, Percy. The Art of Fishing for Men. Philadelphia: Mutual Press, 1935. Paperback edition, Chicago: Moody Press, 1950.
- _________. "A Modern Revival." Revelation (August 1932); 325,349-50.
- _________. Salvation Full and Free: A Series of Radio Messages (Preached on 250 Stations Over The Mutual Network). Philadelphia: Westbrook, 1943.
- _________. Whither Goest Thou? A Series of Radio Messages Preached on 250 Stations over the Mutual Network. East Stroudsburg, Penn.: Pinebrook Book Club, 1946.
- Larson, Mel. Youth for Christ. Grand Rapids, Mich.: Zondervan, 1947.
- Vaughn, Gerald F. "Evangelist Percy Crawford and The King’s College in Delaware, 1941–1955." Delaware History 27, nos. 1-2 (Spring 1996-Winter 1997): 19–41.
