= WJBK (disambiguation) =

WJBK can refer to:

- Wei Ji Bai Ke, Chinese name of Wikipedia
- WJBK, a Fox-affiliated television station in Detroit, Michigan
- WLQV, an AM radio station in Detroit, Michigan, previously known as WJBK
- WUFL (FM), an FM radio station in Detroit, Michigan, previously as WJBK-FM
