= WUFL =

WUFL may refer to:

- WUFL (FM), a radio station (93.1 FM) licensed to serve Detroit, Michigan, United States
- WKEG, a radio station (1030 AM) licensed to serve Sterling Heights, Michigan, which used the call sign WUFL from 1988 to 2023
