= WPLT =

WPLT may refer to:

- WPLT (FM), a radio station (106.3 FM) licensed to serve Sarona, Wisconsin, United States
- WDVD, a radio station (96.3 FM) licensed to serve Detroit, Michigan, United States, assigned call sign WPLT from June 1997 to March 2001
- WQKE, a defunct radio station (93.9 FM) formerly licensed to serve Plattsburgh, New York, United States, assigned call sign WPLT from 1971 until June 1997
