= WOMC =

Classic hits radio station in Detroit

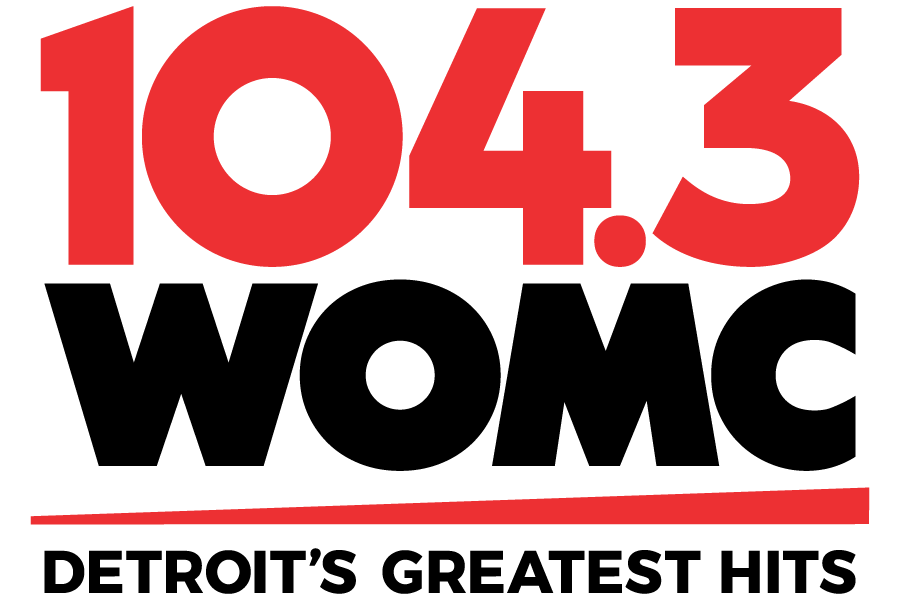
- Detroit, Michigan; United States
- Broadcast area: Metro Detroit
- Frequency: 104.3 MHz (HD Radio)
- Branding: 104.3 WOMC

Programming
- Format: Classic hits
- Subchannels: HD2: Conservative talk radio (WFDF)

Ownership
- Owner: Audacy, Inc.; (Audacy License, LLC)
- Sister stations: WDZH; WWJ; WXYT; WXYT-FM; WYCD

History
- First air date: March 5, 1948
- Former call signs: WEXL-FM (1948–1951)
- Call sign meaning: Wayne, Oakland, and Macomb counties

Technical information
- Licensing authority: FCC
- Facility ID: 28623
- Class: B
- ERP: 190,000 watts
- HAAT: 110 meters (360 ft)
- Transmitter coordinates: 42°28′10″N 83°06′54″W

Links
- Public license information: Public file; LMS
- Webcast: Listen live (via Audacy)
- Website: www.audacy.com/womc

WOMC (104.3 FM, "104.3 WOMC") is a commercial radio station licensed to Detroit, Michigan. It airs a classic hits radio format and is owned by Audacy, Inc. The studios are located on American Drive off 11 Mile Road in Southfield, Michigan. The transmitter is located on Woodward Heights Blvd. in Ferndale.

WOMC is a Class B FM station. It has an effective radiated power (ERP) of 190,000 watts from a height above average terrain (HAAT) of 361 feet (110 meters). It is grandfathered at a much higher power than would be permitted today for Class B stations, 50,000 watts. WOMC broadcasts using HD Radio technology. The HD2 digital subchannel carries a simulcast of WFDF (910 AM), airing a conservative talk format.

== History ==
=== WEXL-FM ===
The station signed on the air on March 5, 1948, as WEXL-FM. It was owned by Royal Oak Broadcasting, along with AM sister station WEXL. Both stations were licensed to Royal Oak, Michigan. The two stations would simulcast much of their programming from 1948 until the 1960s.

WEXL-AM-FM were acquired by family-owned Sparks Broadcasting in the 1950s. J.B. Sparks served as president, with Garnet Sparks and Gordon Sparks serving in other management roles.

In 1951, the FM station changed its call sign to WOMC while the AM station remained WEXL. The call sign stands for "Wayne, Oakland and Macomb Counties". The Sparks were able to boost WOMC's output to 214,000 watts, among the highest-powered FM stations in the U.S. Today, the Federal Communications Commission does not license any station in the Detroit area for more than 50,000 watts, unless it grandfathered from the early days of FM radio.

=== Beautiful music ===
In the 1960s, the FCC began encouraging AM stations to develop new programming for their FM counterparts, rather than simply simulcasting. WOMC switched to a Beautiful Music format, consisting of quarter-hour sweeps of instrumental cover versions of popular songs, as well as Hollywood and Broadway show tunes. Other Detroit stations also ran this largely automated format, including 96.3 WJR-FM and 97.1 WWJ-FM.

WOMC was typically near the bottom of the local Arbitron ratings until 1973, when it was purchased by Metromedia. The new owners retooled WOMC's easy listening format to include brighter and more uptempo material, an approach modeled after the successful WQLR-FM in Kalamazoo. WOMC's sales manager Bob Reinhardt was impressed with WQLR's format, especially when he learned that the station was programmed in-house and did not use a syndicated service. Reinhardt requested that WQLR's programmers create a similar format for WOMC. WOMC's revised beautiful music format was a quick success, lifting the station from 28th place in the Detroit Arbitron ratings into the top three. This marked the beginning of the beautiful music syndication service known as KalaMusic.

=== Soft AC ===
During the late 1970s, WOMC enlisted the help of program director and legendary Detroit disc jockey Dave Shafer, who recruited other well-known Detroit radio personalities Marc Avery, Tom Dean and Nick Arama. By 1980, WOMC evolved from easy listening to a gold-based soft adult contemporary format, which proved to be quite popular. During the 1980s, the adult contemporary format field in Detroit was rather crowded, with WOMC competing against 100.3 WNIC, 94.7 WMJC and 93.1 WLTI. WOMC differentiated itself from its competitors by emphasizing oldies.

In April 1988, Infinity Broadcasting bought WOMC. Infinity was merged into CBS Radio in December 2005.

=== Oldies ===
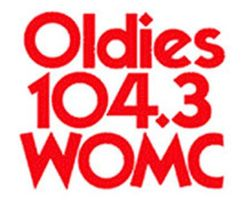
Oldies 104.3 logo

In 1990, WOMC had become almost exclusively an oldies station, despite the fact that Detroit had several other stations playing 1960s and 70s hits at the time, including 102.7 WKSG, 93.9 CKLW-FM, and 560 WHND. Eventually, WOMC came to dominate as the most popular choice for oldies in the market.

WOMC had many memorable slogans, including "WOM-SEE", "Detroit's Big O" and "Music Now!" DJs would say the call letters with an emphasis on the O ("W Ohhh M C").

In 2006, under the leadership of Steve Alan, the station removed the word "Oldies" from all station imaging and jingles, and rebranded as "The Motor City's 104.3." The ratings remained strong during the transition to classic hits.

In early 2007, under the guidance of Detroit-based programming consultant Gary Berkowitz, the station started using the word "Oldies" again in jingles and imaging, but the heritage WOMC call letters were only used for the top of the hour legal station identification. Randy Reeves became the voice of WOMC in promos and liners. The station began using a combination of the "Do It Again" and "Home of the Hits" jingle packages, as well as selected PAMS jingle packages from JAM Creative Productions. Berkowitz then brought in Scott Walker to become program director.

In August 2007, WOMC had begun airing brief jingles and "retromercials" that formerly aired on AM 800 CKLW during its famous Top 40 tenure as the "Big 8." Many of the songs heard on WOMC had been staples on CKLW in the 1960s, 70s and 80s.

=== Classic hits era ===
In April 2009, under the leadership of Tom Bigby, Tim Roberts, and Tom Sleeker, WOMC once again dropped the "Oldies" branding from the station. Once Roberts was named Operations Manager and Program Director, as the transition to "Classic Hits" from "Oldies" continued. During that time, WOMC replaced voiceover guy Charlie Van Dyke with Jeff Davis. The station changed to "104.3 WOMC, Detroit's Greatest Hits."

In 2010, the station added 80s music, while continuing to play a variety of music from the 1960s and 70s. In 2013, WOMC made its usual switch to all Christmas music from mid-November 2013 until December 25. Once Christmas was over, WOMC dropped all music before 1965 and focused on the 70s and 80s while still retaining about a dozen songs from the late 60s in its playlist.

WOMC, along with co-owned WWJ 950, were the flagship stations of the Michigan IMG Sports Network. The two CBS-owned stations carried University of Michigan Wolverines football and some men's basketball games. Most of the games are now heard on only 97.1 WXYT-FM and WWJ.

In 2017, WOMC added some music from the 1990s and early 2000s, while the remainder of the 60s music and most of the early 70s were dropped. By the end of the year, the playlist consisted of music from 1975 to 2002, but heavily focused on the 80s.

=== Entercom ownership ===
On February 2, 2017, CBS Radio announced it would merge with Entercom. The merger was approved on November 9, 2017, and was consummated on the 17th.

On December 26, 2017, after its usual November–December break for Christmas music, the station re-branded as "The New 104.3 WOMC", and returned to a playlist focusing primarily on songs from the late 1960s, 1970s and 1980s, while also dropping post-1980s music. In addition, Bobby Mitchell and Stacey DuFord would step down as morning hosts, being replaced in the interim by Jeff Miles, formerly of WKLB-FM in Boston.

In March 2018, WOMC announced that former WXYZ-TV anchor Stephen Clark would join the station as a new morning host, beginning on April 2. In addition, his former WXYZ-TV co-anchor JoAnne Purtan, daughter of former longtime WOMC morning host Dick Purtan, joined Clark as co-host the following week.

In 2020, WOMC once again dropped all songs older than 1970 from the playlist, and re-added music from the 1990s and early 2000s. Stephen Clark also departed from the morning show, with J.J. Johnson adjusting his mid-day hours to also co-host the morning show with JoAnne Purtan. Jason Raithel joined as a producer. On September 11, 2023, J.J. Johnson announced his retirement, with his last day being December 1. Purtan and Raithel remain in mornings. Ben Campbell joined them in March 2024.

=== Christmas music ===
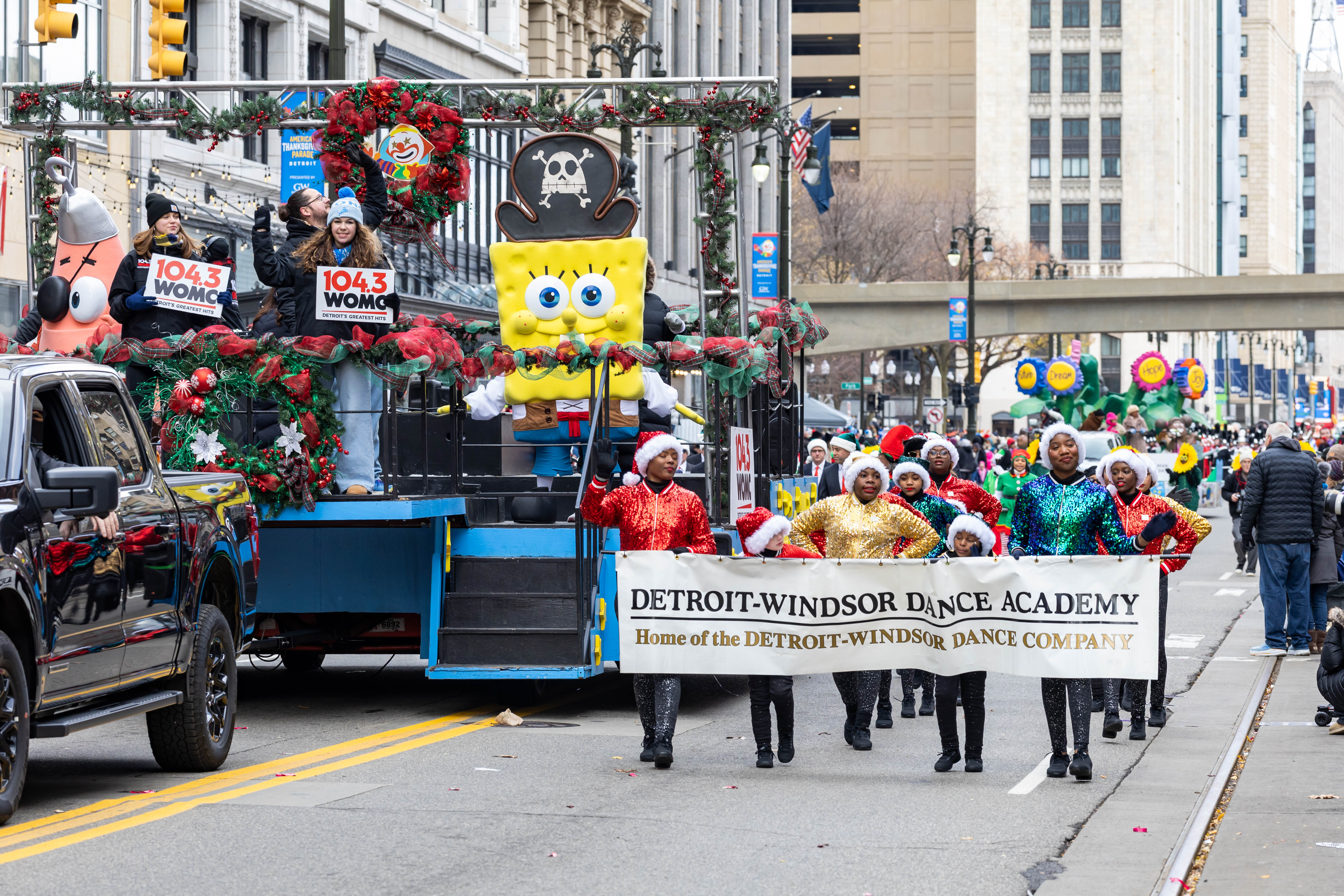
WOMC float (left) in the 2025 America's Thanksgiving Parade

For much of the 2000s, WOMC would play all-Christmas music from mid-November until Christmas, suspending its classic hits format in those weeks. In November 2019, WOMC did not switch to all-Christmas music as in past years, delegating the programming to Soft AC-formatted sister station WDZH until 2020.

Instead of going all-Christmas from November until the holidays, WOMC plays some holiday songs mixed in with its usual format those weeks. Christmas music airs on WOMC on December 24 and 25, meaning that WOMC now only plays all-Christmas music on Christmas Eve and Day.

== HD Radio ==
WOMC is licensed for HD Radio operations, and has two subchannels. Originally, WOMC-HD2 featured hits of the 1950s and 1960s. Gradually, the format began to evolve into pop hits of the 1960s, 1970s and 1980s. WOMC had changed its station voice twice, and at one time, all three station voices could be heard doing liners for WOMC-HD2. In January 2008, WOMC-HD2's format changed back to the hits of the 1950s and 1960s. Every day, beginning at 1:00 p.m., the station played an hour of Elvis music. The station would also occasionally play a retro PAMS jingle from the early-mid 1990s.

In November 2008, WOMC had plans to re-create the sound of legendary Detroit Top 40 station WKNR Keener 13 for its HD2 stream. On November 8, 2008, a Keener Radio logo appeared on WOMC's website. However, the program director of the HD2 channel, Ted Richards, was let go in April 2009, and the Keener Radio idea never took off. In April 2009, WOMC-HD2 picked up the "Oldies 104.3" branding which was dropped from the main FM channel, and would also shift its format to playing music from the 1950s, 1960s and 1970s.

In February 2010, WOMC added an HD3 channel known as "New Sky Radio: New Horizons, No Boundaries." It mainly featured psychic talk shows and readings, along with various lifestyle talk shows. On January 1, 2014, WOMC-HD3 dropped "New Sky Radio," switching to an all-Detroit artists format, branded as "Detroit's Boulevard 104-3." This would later rebrand as "Musictown 104.3."

For a time, the HD subchannels were turned off. The HD2 subchannel returned with a simulcast of conservative talk-formatted WFDF 910 AM on November 1, 2023.

== See also ==
- Media in Detroit
