= WDTW (AM) =

- Dearborn, Michigan; United States
- Broadcast area: Metro Detroit
- Frequency: 1310 kHz
- Branding: La Z 1310 & 107.9

Programming
- Language: Spanish
- Format: Contemporary hit radio and regional Mexican

Ownership
- Owner: Pedro Zamora; (Zamora Broadcasting Systems, Inc.)

History
- First air date: December 29, 1946
- Former call signs: WKMH (1946–1963); WKNR (1963–1972); WNIC (1972–1977); WWKR (1977–1986); WNIC (1986); WMTG (1986–1995); WDOZ (1995–1997); WYUR (1997–2000); WXDX (2000–2005); WDTW (2005–2006); WWWW (2006)
- Call sign meaning: DTW is the IATA airport code for the Detroit Metropolitan Airport

Technical information
- Licensing authority: FCC
- Facility ID: 6593
- Class: B
- Power: 5,000 watts
- Transmitter coordinates: 42°15′50.1″N 83°15′15.7″W
- Translator: 107.9 W300DI (Dearborn)

Links
- Public license information: Public file; LMS
- Website: laz1310.com

WDTW (1310 kHz, "La Z 1310 & 107.9") is a commercial AM radio station licensed to Dearborn, Michigan, and serving the Detroit metropolitan area. Owned by Pedro Zamora, the station broadcasts a Spanish-language radio format branded as La Z 1310. It features Spanish-language contemporary hit radio and regional Mexican. The station's studios and offices are on Goddard Road in Taylor, Michigan.

WDTW is powered at 5,000 watts using a directional antenna with a six-tower array. Its transmitter is on Monroe Boulevard near Interstate 94 in Taylor. Programming is also heard on 85-watt FM translator W300DI at 107.9 MHz in Detroit.

== History ==
=== Early years ===
The station signed on the air on December 29, 1946. Its original call sign was WKMH, the station's owner was Fred A. Knorr, who served as president and general manager. It was originally a daytime-only station broadcasting on 1540 kHz. It added an FM station, WKMH-FM 100.3 (now WNIC) in the same month. WKMH moved to its current frequency and began round-the-clock operations in 1948.

WKMH-AM-FM specialized in local news, information, sports, and mainly middle of the road (MOR) music, and from 1952 to 1963, served as the radio flagship for Detroit Tigers baseball. WKMH's most popular personality was Robin Seymour, a pioneering rock and roll disk jockey. Seymour's "Bobbin' with Robin" show featured a music mix that foreshadowed the birth of the Top 40 radio format in playing R&B and early rock and roll artists like The Crows alongside mainstream pop stars like Patti Page. Seymour remained with the station as it became WKNR and later became the host of Swingin' Time, a popular local teenage dance show on CKLW-TV.

WKMH garnered some notice through early 1960s Top 40 shows hosted by personalities such as Lee Alan "On the Horn" and Dave "Sangoo" Prince, but the station was generally considered an also-ran in the Detroit market and a weak competitor to WJBK and WXYZ, which were Detroit's dominant Top 40 stations. At night, the station featured a jazz show hosted by Jim Rockwell (later of WABX). In addition, WKMH was briefly Detroit's CBS Radio network affiliate in 1960, after WJR dropped its ties to CBS to add more local programming. Despite, or some might say because of, this unusual move, WKMH continued to flounder.

In 1962, the station shed its CBS affiliation (which WJR regained) and became "Flagship Radio", an early adult contemporary format featuring a mix of softer current pop hits and MOR album cuts, but this format, too, was not popular.

=== "Keener 13" ===
Despite the power of WJBK and WXYZ and the 50,000-watt signal of CKLW, consultant Mike Joseph (best known for developing the Hot Hits format in the late 1970s) was convinced there was room for a fourth Top 40 station in Detroit and that 1310 AM could easily climb ahead of the competition. With WKMH owner Nellie Knorr, he developed the formula that ultimately became a success.

Joseph instituted a shorter playlist of only 31 records plus one "key song" of the week and a liberal sprinkling of oldies. Most Top 40 stations of that era played many more current records. WJBK, WXYZ and CKLW all had very long playlists at the time, stretching to 80 to 100 songs at times. WKNR's shorter playlist ensured the station played more hits and fewer "stiffs" and that listeners would hear one of the top hits whenever they tuned in. WKNR also played the hits 24 hours a day, as opposed to the other hit stations in Detroit which were loaded with non-music full-service features (especially on weekends).

WKNR officially launched on October 31, 1963, with the "Battle of the Giants", an attention-grabbing promotion that invited listeners to call in to vote for their favorite oldies. The station quickly gained momentum, and in an unprecedented "worst-to-first" move, three months later "Keener" was a solid across-the-board number one in the ratings. This happened despite a weak signal which missed most of the east side of the Detroit metro area, especially at night, although the station could be heard market-wide on its more powerful FM simulcast on 100.3 MHz. WKNR became the preeminent Top 40 radio station in the Motor City. Competitors WJBK and WXYZ were hurt in the ratings by their new competitor, and both stations eventually were driven out of Top 40 and into MOR formats. It has been reported that the legendary Henry Ford II himself was an avid Keener fan.

Keener featured popular personalities like Dick Purtan, Bob Green, Gary Stevens (later of New York's legendary WMCA), J. Michael Wilson, Scott Regen, Ted Clark and Jim Jeffries. It played a mix of music that included a number of local acts featuring many of Detroit's Motown superstars. Scott Regen's "Motown Monday" features included live concerts from the Roostertail supper club, featuring Motown legends such as the Supremes and The Four Tops Dick Purtan honed the wry, sardonic sense of humor that made him a fixture on the Motor City airwaves for four decades, first on WKNR. The station's promotions, imaging, and jingles were noted for their wacky, offbeat sound and were imitated frequently by other stations across the country, including sister station WKFR in Battle Creek, Michigan, which was known as "Keener 14". Bob Green would later describe the Keener sound as being like "a 24-hour cartoon".

Keener 13's appeal to adult listeners as well as teens was cemented with the station's news commitment. "Contact News" aired at :15 and :45 past the hour every hour. WKNR's newscasts were straightforward and lacked the flash or sensationalism of CKLW's "blood-and-guts" 20/20 News but were highly regarded. The station released a "Year in Review" album each year which was made available to area schools.

WKNR's dominance was challenged when CKLW 800 AM got a makeover courtesy of consultants Bill Drake and Paul Drew in April 1967. With 50,000 watts behind it and a lightning-fast pace based on Drake's "Boss Radio" model, The Big 8 became the number one Top 40 station in the region. Some of Keener's top DJs, including Dick Purtan and Scott Regen, eventually moved over to CKLW. However, WKNR did not go down without a fight, continuing to battle the Big 8 for five more years despite dropping ratings. During this time, the station attempted to distinguish itself from CKLW by playing less bubblegum pop and more album rock cuts. It promoted itself as "Rock and Roll The American Way", a jab at CKLW's location in Windsor, Ontario, and Canadian Radio-television and Telecommunications Commission-mandated "Canadian content" regulations imposed at the start of 1971. Sister station WKNR-FM 100.3, which had previously simulcast the AM programming, switched to a more adventurous progressive rock format starting in 1969. But by 1971, WKNR-FM flipped to an easy listening "Stereo Island" format, switching its call sign to WNIC.

The Keener 13 era is celebrated at keener13.com, with an extensive history, an archive of air checks and a database of every WKNR Music Guide in addition to an online tribute webcast called wknrkeener13.com.

=== Easy Listening and Oldies ===
On April 25, 1972, "Keener 13" ended its Top 40 format. The final song was "Turn! Turn! Turn!" by The Byrds. WKNR began playing the same easy listening format that was successful on 100.3 WNIC, simulcasting its FM sister station. WNIC-FM changed to a soft adult contemporary format in 1976. AM 1310 simulcast for a short time until the decision was made in 1977, to revive the "Keener 13" brand name on its original frequency with an adult-oriented Top 40 and oldies mix and a new call sign, WWKR. (The WKNR call sign was unavailable after having been installed on the former WKFR, now WBFN). The legendary "Keener 13" record survey, the "Keener Music Guide", was also brought back, but was published on a monthly rather than weekly basis. The second version of "Keener 13" did not have the success of the original, and by 1980, AM 1310 was back to simulcasting WNIC-FM.

Since late 1986, AM 1310 has tried several other different formats, none of which have attained lasting success, and has been in and out of simulcasting WNIC 100.3 between formats. Other formats heard on 1310 since 1986 include:

- WMTG: satellite-fed rhythmic oldies, 1986–1994. Programming came from Satellite Music Network's "Heart and Soul" package. The calls stood for "Motown Gold".
- WDOZ: children's programming, 1994–1996 (affiliated with the Radio AAHS network on December 18, 1994, at 9 am, and then with KidStar network in July 1996, after AAHS went under)
- WYUR: "Your Radio Station"/Personality news-talk/adult standards/classical, 1997–2000. This permutation of AM 1310 was started by veteran WJR broadcaster Bob Hynes in an attempt to revive the sound of the 50,000-watt giant at AM 760 before it changed to the standard news/talk outlet it is now. After longtime classical-music station WQRS changed format in November 1997, the station added classical music to its schedule. However, WYUR had only a minimal impact in the ratings.
- WXDX: "The X"/sports radio (Fox Sports Radio), 2000–2002
- WXDX: "The X"/talk (mostly syndicated), 2002–2005

In 2005, 1310 became WDTW, owned by Clear Channel Communications. The station featured a progressive talk format. The station's call sign temporarily changed to WWWW on July 24, 2006, as part of a station swap between Clear Channel Communications and Cumulus Media in the Ann Arbor and Canton, Ohio markets. On September 15, 2006, the call sign were changed back to WDTW.

On January 21, 2010, WDTW's network, Air America Media, filed for Chapter 7 Bankruptcy and ceased live programming the same night. Reruns of Air America's programming continued to air until January 25 at 9 pm Eastern Time. After that, WDTW had to find other programs.

=== Donation to Minority Media ===
On December 11, 2012, Clear Channel announced it would donate WDTW to the Minority Media and Telecommunications Council (MMTC), as part of the Ownership Diversity Initiative between Clear Channel and the MMTC. The MMTC did not announce any specific plans for the station.

On December 14, 2012, it was revealed that the MMTC donation applied only to the license of the station, as Clear Channel announced that WDTW would cease broadcasting at midnight on December 31. The station's antennas and transmitter facilities near the intersection of I-94 and Telegraph Road in Taylor were dismantled shortly afterward.

=== Spanish-language programming ===
First logo after WDTW's rebirth as a Spanish station

In 2014, the MMTC chose to resell WDTW to Pedro Zamora, who owns several Spanish-language radio stations and a promoter specializing in Spanish-language musicians, for $100,000. After the sale, WDTW reconstructed its broadcast facilities, a process that had an estimated cost of around $1 million. In April 2016, the station officially re-launched as La Mega Detroit 1310. Zamora entered into arrangements with TSJ Media (which operates La Mega stations in other markets) to assist in WDTW's operations. The station was operated out of TSJ's facilities in Columbus, Ohio, while WDTW completed the build-out of its studio in Taylor, Michigan, and hired full-time staff members. TSJ's owner Josh Guttman stated that he also planned for WDTW to pursue Spanish-language broadcast rights to local professional sports teams, as TSJ had successfully done in Ohio.

On July 21, 2017, WDTW activated a low-powered FM translator on 107.9 MHz in Detroit, W300DI. That year, the station also dropped the La Mega brand in favor of La Z 1310. Ironically, the translator is co-located on the same tower as WDTW's former sister station and simulcast partner, WNIC, near the intersection of Schoolcraft Rd and Turner St.

In 2025, WDTW picked up the Detroit Tigers Radio Network's Spanish-language coverage, covering all home and postseason games, returning the team to the station for the first time, though in a different language, since the end of the 1963 season.

== See also ==
- Media in Detroit
