= WLLZ (FM) =

Classic rock radio station in Detroit

- Detroit, Michigan; United States
- Broadcast area: Metro Detroit
- Frequency: 106.7 MHz (HD Radio)
- Branding: 106-7 WLLZ: Detroit's Wheels

Programming
- Format: Mainstream rock
- Subchannels: HD2: "iHeart80s" (80s Music); HD3: "iHeart90s" (90s Music)

Ownership
- Owner: iHeartMedia; (iHM Licenses, LLC)
- Sister stations: WDFN; WJLB; WKQI; WMXD; WNIC

History
- First air date: October 16, 1960
- Former call signs: WDTM (1960–1966); WWWW (1966–1992); WWWW-FM (1992–2000); WLLC (2000–2002); WDTW (2002–2005); WDTW-FM (2005–2019)
- Call sign meaning: sounds like "wheels"

Technical information
- Licensing authority: FCC
- Facility ID: 59952
- Class: B
- ERP: 39,000 watts
- HAAT: 169 meters (554 ft)
- Transmitter coordinates: 42°21′6″N 83°3′48″W

Links
- Public license information: Public file; LMS
- Webcast: Listen live (via iHeartRadio)
- Website: 1067wllz.iheart.com

WLLZ (106.7 MHz, Detroit's Wheels) is a commercial FM radio station licensed to Detroit, Michigan. It is owned by iHeartMedia and it broadcasts a mainstream rock radio format. Its studios are in downtown Detroit in Eastern Market.

WLLZ has an effective radiated power (ERP) of 39,000 watts. The transmitter is near the campus of Wayne State University and the intersection of Cass Avenue and Canfield Street. It shares the transmitter site with WDET-FM.

== History ==
=== Classical and jazz (1960–1966) ===
The station began operations on October 16, 1960, as WDTM (for its city of license, Detroit, Michigan); it started out airing classical music and jazz. It was owned by Taliesin Stations and was an affiliate of the WQXR Network, based at the leading New York City classical station.

=== Beautiful music (1966–1970) ===
In 1966, Gordon McLendon purchased the station, changed the call sign to WWWW ("W4"), and installed a beautiful music format. The station was located at 2930 E. Jefferson Avenue in Detroit, in a building now housing the marijuana law firm Cannabis Counsel, P.L.C.

=== Oldies (1970–1971) ===
By 1970, McLendon changed W4's format from easy listening to "Solid Gold" (oldies-oriented Top 40) as "W4 Stereo". The disc jockey staff included Don Schuster and Detroit radio legend Tom Clay. During its Solid Gold period, W4 was one of the first stations to pick up Detroit radio veteran Casey Kasem's newly syndicated countdown show, American Top 40.

=== Album rock (1971–1981) ===
In 1971, "W4" became an album oriented rock station. In 1974, it briefly styled itself "W4 Quad" during its brief use of quadrophonic transmission. In the late 1970s, album-rock W4 was one of the top-rated radio stations in Detroit.

Shamrock Broadcasting purchased W4 in July 1979. The station is most remembered today as one of the early radio jobs for Howard Stern, who was brought in from Hartford, Connecticut, to host mornings, beginning April 21, 1980. However, W4 was one of four Detroit stations with an AOR format, and faced with increasing competition and rapidly falling ratings, management decided to make a change.

=== Country (1981–1999) ===
With no advance notice, Shamrock changed the station's format to country music on January 18, 1981. At first, the DJs, including Stern, were kept on to play country hits. The station reportedly planned to brand Howard Stern as "Hopalong Howie", which he declined after two weeks, moving to WWDC-FM in Washington, D.C. In the film Private Parts, Stern announces his departure in the middle of a song, claiming he didn't understand country music.

The move to country music paid off; the Detroit radio market, the nation's fifth largest at the time, had no FM country music station. In addition, Detroit and its suburbs had a sizable percentage of the population whose families hailed from the Southern United States and grew up with the genre. W4 Country's first years coincided with the rise in popularity of country music, even outside the South. At the time of the country format's launch, the immediate Detroit area's only country music station was on AM, WCXI at 1130 kHz. WWWW became the first FM country station in Detroit since WCAR-FM's and CKLW-FM's brief tries at the format in the mid-1970s. As a result, WCXI's ratings fell. By the early 1990s, AM 1130 was being used as a simulcast for W4.

"W4 Country" lasted almost two decades and did reasonably well in the ratings, under the leadership of programmer Barry Mardit, who joined the station in late 1981. The station posted a #1 finish in the Fall 1992 Detroit Arbitron radio ratings with an 8.7 share. The following year, the station gained a strong competitor in WYCD, causing WWWW's ratings to decline. Recording artist Holly Dunn served as morning co-host on W4 Country during the late 1990s. Declining ratings and revenue led owners AMFM (which became part of Clear Channel Communications in August 2000) to drop the country format at 6 p.m. on September 1, 1999. The final song played on "W4 Country" was "The Dance" by Garth Brooks, followed by "The Star-Spangled Banner".

=== Classic hits (1999–2002) ===
Logo 1999–2002

Logo 2002–06

For two days, WWWW stunted with a 400-Hz tone, and ran a contest to correctly guess the day and time that the tone would end. On September 3, 1999, at 2:05 p.m., the station relaunched as "Alice 106.7", featuring "Rockin' Hits of the '80s and '90s". The first song was "All Right Now" by Free.

The callsign WWWW remained for another year until the new call sign WLLC was adopted on October 2, 2000. Emphasis was eventually put on the "C" during reciting the legal station identification ("WLL..See") due to listeners mistakenly believing the station picked up call letters WLLZ, which had been used on 98.7 (now WDZH). In September 2000, the WWWW call sign moved to 102.9 MHz, the former WIQB, in nearby Ann Arbor, also owned by Clear Channel.

While WYCD benefited from the end of "W4 Country", ratings for "Alice" remained anemic.

=== Classic rock (2002–2006) ===
In July 2002, WLLC changed its call letters to WDTW-FM and relaunched as "106.7 The Drive". It mainly featured classic hard rock tracks from the 1970s through the 1990s with a more upbeat and harder-edged presentation than classic rock rival WCSX. WDTW-FM's ratings continued to be poor.

=== Country (2006–2009) ===
At noon on May 17, 2006, "The Drive" signed off with "Too Late For Love" by Def Leppard, followed by an announcement from legendary Detroit TV news anchor Bill Bonds, talking about "building a brand new radio station" at 106.7 and "letting you, the listeners, choose the music". For the next week, listeners who registered at 1067needshelp.com picked the new radio format, the station's name, logo, voice of the station and number of commercials per hour.

On May 19, after playing two days of music from many formats, then narrowing it down to just rock and country, it was announced at 3 p.m. that the format would be country music. The first official song played under the country format was "Save a Horse (Ride a Cowboy)" by Big & Rich. On May 22, the station became "106.7 The Fox". Finally, on May 26, 2006, the format change appeared complete as the voice of the station and minutes of music per hour were announced. Radio insiders believed the station had adopted a country format only to steal listeners from WYCD, and keep co-owned WNIC in the #1 slot. Ratings for The Fox remained low during its entire run and had little impact on WYCD. On April 29, 2009, WDTW-FM went jockless and soft-relaunched under the branding of "Detroit Fox Country 106-7". The station also began putting more focus on newer country music.

=== Rhythmic (2009–2011) ===
On September 4, 2009, at noon, WDTW flipped to rhythmic adult contemporary as The Beat of Detroit. The final song on “The Fox” was “Shuttin’ Detroit Down” by John Rich, while the first song on “The Beat” was “Into the Groove” by Detroit native Madonna. The station featured a mix of current and hit rhythmic and dance music, mostly from the 1980s and 1990s, with some 1970s disco hits.

By 2010, with CBS Radio's WVMV's flip to top 40, and sister station WKQI's shift in a mainstream top 40 direction, WDTW began pivoting towards a conventional rhythmic contemporary direction by adding more current music and cutting back on the heavy amount of gold product. WDTW-FM still featured many Rhythmic AC elements in its presentation. The station would later reintroduce some 1980s and 1990s gold into rotation, usually two or three songs per hour, although 1970s disco music was not part of the format. The station also introduced the "Back In The Day Lunch Party" at Noon and "90s at 9" every evening. In addition, it blended in a few Dance cuts as well. Sean "Hollywood" Hamilton's syndicated Remix Top 30 aired on Sunday evenings. The Beat also brought in some well known personalities including WDRQ vet Lisa Lisa Orlando for middays, Joe Rosati of Z100 in New York City for afternoons, and Jevon Hollywood, also from WDRQ, for late nights. Mornings and evenings were voicetracked by Paul "Cubby" Bryant of WKTU in New York City and Billy The Kidd of 106.1 Kiss-FM in Dallas. Former WDRQ morning host Jay Towers was hired as program director.

Ratings throughout The Beat's history were moderate, usually peaking in the mid-3 share range or lower. In the last ratings book as a Rhythmic Top 40, WDTW-FM was ranked #18 with a 2.2 share of the market.

=== Classic rock (2011–2017) ===
The D logo, 2011-17

On November 4, 2011, at 10 a.m., WDTW-FM changed its format back to classic rock, branded as 106.7 The D. The final song on "The Beat" was "End of the Road" by Boyz II Men, while the first song on "The D" was "For Those About To Rock (We Salute You)" by AC/DC.

The station described the new format as "The Next Generation of Classic Rock", meaning the station included more 1980s rock, along with the usual 1970s titles, as well as early 1990s' rock material. The station remained automated until early 2012, when the station began assembling a DJ staff. WDTW-FM brought in radio vet Sheri Donovan for middays and WGRD vet Dave Dahmer for afternoons. Alan Cox hosted the morning drive time shift live from a studio in Cleveland.

=== Adult hits (2017) ===
On May 26, 2017, WDTW-FM segued to a variety hits format, while still branding as "The D". Following the switch, the station's ratings share fell from 2.7 to a 2.2 share, putting it at #19 in the market by October 2017.

=== Alternative rock (2017–2019) ===
Alt 106.7 logo, 2017-19

On November 20, 2017, at 9:24 p.m., after playing "Closing Time" by Semisonic, WDTW-FM flipped to an alternative rock format as Alt 106-7, launching with a 10,000 songs commercial-free promotion. The first song was "Seven Nation Army" by Detroit band The White Stripes. The new format gave Detroit its first alternative rock station since WMGC-FM's period as 105.1 The Edge from 1997 to 1999, while also co-existing with Bell Media's active rock-leaning alternative station CIMX (which targets Windsor).

It was speculated that the flip was intended to preempt Entercom's WDZH from flipping to alternative under the company's own Alt brand, which it had done with Amp Radio stations in several other markets immediately after its merger with CBS Radio (the station would instead switch to soft adult contemporary, before finally switching to alternative in 2020 in reaction to CIMX's flip to country).

=== Classic rock (2019–present) ===
WDTW-FM's alternative rock format had fallen to a 1.5 share by January 2019, putting it well behind Beasley's market-leading WRIF, which airs an active rock format. On March 1, 2019, at Noon, after playing "In Bloom" by Nirvana, the station began stunting with a loop of "It's a Long Way to the Top (If You Wanna Rock 'n' Roll)" by AC/DC. At 1 p.m., the station returned to classic rock once more as 106.7 WLLZ, Detroit's Wheels, reviving a brand that had previously been used on WDZH prior to its switch to smooth jazz in 1995. The first song on the revived WLLZ was "Back in Black", also by AC/DC.

The station's call letters were officially changed to WLLZ on March 8, 2019. Both the WLLZ and WDTW-FM call signs were briefly warehoused by a sister station in North Carolina.

On April 22, 2022, iHeartMedia filed a construction permit with the FCC to reduce WLLZ’s power to 39,000 watts, along with a relocation of their transmitter and antenna to a tower shared with NPR affiliate WDET. According to the filing with the FCC, this move would allow WLLZ to gain some antenna height versus their old setup, and transmitting from 169 meters HAAT, as opposed to their old setup of 155 meters from atop the Cadillac Tower. If approved, WLLZ will lose its "grandfathered" status.

On February 5, 2026, the license for the changes mentioned in the above paragraph were complete.

On August 17, 2026, WLLZ refreshed their playlist, removing most of the pre-1990s tracks and incorporating music from the 1990s through the 2010s, moving more towards a mainstream rock direction.

== HD Radio ==
WLLZ broadcasts in the HD Radio format. WLLZ's HD2 subchannel has changed several times since its inception in 2006. From January 2006 to December 2009, the HD2 channel was known as "The Mother Trucker" and featured a mix of country and rock music. In December 2009, the format was changed to Clear Channel's Pride Radio which featured dance music geared toward the LGBT community.

On November 4, 2011, after the main frequency changed to classic rock, the HD2 format changed as well. This time, it began carrying Clear Channel's "Alternative Project" feed from iHeartRadio. The HD2 channel's format was changed again to the "Rock Nation Top 20" from iHeartRadio after the analog/HD1 channel's format switched to alternative rock.

Sometime after the main frequency switched to "Alt 106.7", WDTW-FM added an HD3 subchannel known as "WLLZ-Detroit Wheels" which played oldies and has remained in place even after the main channel adopted the "WLLZ" branding.

With the main channel's switch to classic rock on March 1, 2019, the HD2 channel briefly switched to a feed of iHeartRadio's Smells Like the 90s channel (which focused on alternative rock from the 1990s), before switching to a rhythmic contemporary format as Wild 106.7 in July.

On March 14, 2025, the "iHeart 80s" and "iHeart 90s" stations were added to the HD2 and HD3 channels.
