= WKQI =

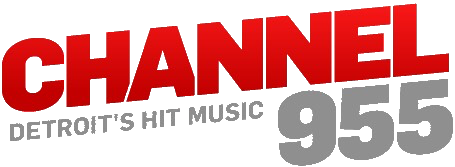
- Detroit, Michigan; United States
- Broadcast area: Metro Detroit; Southeast Michigan
- Frequency: 95.5 MHz (HD Radio)
- Branding: Channel 9-5-5

Programming
- Format: Top 40 (CHR)
- Affiliations: Premiere Networks

Ownership
- Owner: iHeartMedia, Inc.; (iHM Licenses, LLC)
- Sister stations: WDFN, WLLZ, WJLB, WMXD, WNIC

History
- First air date: February 12, 1949
- Former call signs: WLDM (1949–1978); WCZY (1978–1985); WCZY-FM (1985–1989)

Technical information
- Licensing authority: FCC
- Facility ID: 6592
- Class: B
- ERP: 100,000 watts
- HAAT: 130 meters (430 ft)
- Transmitter coordinates: 42°28′22″N 83°11′59″W

Links
- Public license information: Public file; LMS
- Webcast: Listen live (via iHeartRadio)
- Website: channel955.iheart.com

WKQI (95.5 FM) is a commercial radio station licensed to Detroit, Michigan, featuring a top 40 (CHR) format known as "Channel 9-5-5". Owned by iHeartMedia, the station serves Metro Detroit and much of Southeast Michigan and southwestern portions of Ontario, including Windsor. The station's studios are located in Eastern Market in Detroit, while the transmitter is located in Oak Park, Michigan, on 10 Mile Road near Greenfield Road. In addition to a standard analog transmission, WKQI broadcasts over HD Radio using the in-band on-channel standard, and is available online via iHeartRadio.

At 100,000 watts ERP, WKQI operates as a "grandfathered superpower" FM station. According to the FCC, this same setup would be allotted only 50,000 watts ERP if newly licensed today.

== History ==
=== Beginnings: WLDM ===
The station signed on the air on February 12, 1949, owned by the Lincoln Broadcasting Company with studios at 15401 West Ten Mile Road. The original call sign was WLDM, a classical music station. At first, a few Andre Kostelanetz, Morton Gould, and Percy Faith light music recordings were played. It was not until 1951, when the station took up storecasting (broadcasting music for stores and restaurants), that those and other popular orchestras were heard regularly. The playlist included popular orchestra selections, light classical, and some serious classical music, as "albums in high-fidelity". Evenings were devoted to concert works.

An audience of non-client listeners developed slowly, but when Lincoln Broadcasting moved the storecast to its subcarrier in late 1957 and rededicated the main channel solely to classical recordings, enough of an outcry arose that a substantial amount of daytime popular music was eventually restored. In the late 1950s and early 1960s, the station enjoyed prestige as the area's premier purveyor of "good music." It added Broadway and Hollywood showtunes from original cast albums, folk music and other hi-fi recordings. Some spoken-word and dramatic presentations were also heard.

In 1961, WLDM increased its power and started broadcasting in stereo. Three years later, most of the classical shows were dropped in favor of beautiful music, a move that led to high ratings and greatly increased revenue for the remainder of the 1960s, but declined throughout the 1970s. WLDM was also an industry leader with technical improvements, such as vertical signal polarization to improve reception on portable and car radios. It referred to itself as "America's Foremost FM Station".

=== WCZY ===
By the mid-1970s, Detroit had a large number of beautiful music stations, with WWJ-FM, WJR-FM, WNIC, and WOMC all competing with WLDM for the easy listening audience. After being sold to Combined Communications, the new owners made a change. WLDM switched its call letters to WCZY-FM ("Cozy FM") on May 5, 1978.

WCZY's format, under Robert Gaskins, was a steady performer in Detroit's Arbitron ratings during the late 1970s, with popular personalities including Paul Bryon (mornings), Al Gaige (middays), and Bob Martin (afternoons). The station's ratings peak came in the spring of 1980, with WCZY registering a fourth-place showing in the overall 12+ ratings. WCZY consistently ranked the highest of Detroit's three beautiful music stations. (Its competitors at the time were WJR-FM and WWJ-FM. WNIC and WOMC had flipped to adult contemporary by then.) During this time, WCZY used the services of syndicators Churchill and Schulke (the latter's Schulke II package) for its beautiful music format. But unlike its competitors, WJR-FM and WWJ-FM, the station was not fully automated and made use of live announcers.

In 1978, former country station WDEE-AM (1500) was acquired, and its call letters changed to WCZY-AM with a similar format. Even though several top-rated disc jockeys like Bob Martin were moved to the AM, the poor signal of the station hindered it from producing the successful ratings the FM station enjoyed. Bob Martin was then moved back to the FM, and WCZY-AM changed to WLQV-AM (Love Radio) with a Christian radio format put in place.

=== Gannett ownership ===
In 1981, the Combined Communications chain was purchased by the Gannett newspaper chain. Gannett, not satisfied with the revenue the station was already generating, moved WCZY into an adult contemporary format that year in hopes of attracting younger listeners and thus increasing ad revenue.

The entire on-air staff was let go, and Dick Purtan was brought in from CKLW to host the station's morning show at the start of 1983. During 1983, the station's music became more and more up-tempo and youth-oriented. By the end of the year, the format was Top 40/CHR for all intents and purposes, despite continuing to use the "Cozy FM" moniker. The station's final transformation into "Z95.5" was complete by the fall of 1984. Purtan's morning show kept WCZY high in the overall ratings during this transition period, but advertising revenues did not meet expectations.

=== All Hits Z95.5 ===
"Z95.5" enjoyed a fair amount of ratings success with its CHR format, usually rated in Detroit's top ten Arbitron ratings 12+, though arguably much of the station's high ratings came from Purtan's show. In an attempt to be more palatable to adult listeners, WCZY was more of an Adult Top 40, avoiding most rap, dance, and hard rock songs unless they were successful pop crossovers. Although WCZY's overall 12+ ratings were often better than WHYT's, WHYT was much more popular with teenage and young adult listeners.

For a time, WCZY also simulcast its programming again on AM 1500. (WLQV once again changed its calls to WCZY-AM, with the station I.D.-ing as "Z95.5 and AM 1500.") It was part of a ploy to "return Dick Purtan to the AM dial." It lasted only a few years before AM 1500 returned to its previous religious format as WLQV.

In April 1987, Sky Broadcasting bought WCZY, with the AM station being sold to Satellite Radio Network. Sky Broadcasting only held WCZY for a short time, as Broadcasting Partners bought the station two years later.

=== Q95/Q95-5 ===
Despite Z95.5's high ratings, the station still wanted to attract some older listeners in the hope of attracting more advertising dollars. On July 20, 1989, WCZY changed its call sign and moniker to WKQI, "Q95," dropped hard rock and rap from its playlist, and added more gold from the 1970s and 1980s. Detroit based AC radio consultant Gary Berkowitz was the original Q95 program director. The station's DJ lineup included Dick Purtan in mornings and air personalities Kevin O'Neill and Michael Waite (formerly of rival WHYT).

Q95 started as an Adult CHR, but by late 1990, had shifted to mainstream adult contemporary to challenge incumbent AC outlets WNIC and WLTI. (WLTI later flipped to Top 40 and became WKQI's CHR arch-rival as WDRQ.) WKQI's ratings continued to be respectable throughout the 1990s. Dick Purtan was an investor in the new station and stayed on as WKQI's morning host until March 1996, when he left for Oldies station WOMC.

Following Purtan's departure, WKQI became "Q95-5, Detroit's Continuous Hit Music Station." Former Partridge Family star Danny Bonaduce was hired as morning show host, and the station shifted back to an Adult CHR presentation, adding alternative-pop artists such as Alanis Morissette, Sarah McLachlan, Joan Osborne, Live, and The BoDeans, which the station had not played previously. For most of the late 1990s, WKQI was a heavily dayparted station, being a fairly conservative Hot AC during the day but taking more of a CHR approach at night, while still shying away from most hip hop music and rap except for artists with mainstream pop appeal such as Will Smith, Toni Braxton, and Ghost Town DJs.

WKQI's ownership would also change a few times during the 1990s. Evergreen Media bought out Broadcasting Partners in May 1995, with Chancellor buying out Evergreen in 1997. Chancellor, in turn, merged with Capstar to form AMFM, Inc., which was swallowed up by Clear Channel in 1999.

=== Top 40 wars: WKQI vs. WDRQ ===
Danny Bonaduce kept WKQI's morning ratings high, but after he departed in January 1998, the station began to falter. ABC/Disney-owned rhythmic-based rival WDRQ took advantage of WKQI's weak spots by moving to a more mainstream Top 40 format with a hotter, more energetic presentation than WKQI. WDRQ also gained an advantage on WKQI, which remained a fairly conservative station musically, by emphasizing the then-hot teen-pop movement and stars like Backstreet Boys, Britney Spears, Spice Girls, and *NSYNC. By the summer of 2000, WKQI had sunk to fourteenth place in the ratings, while WDRQ had charged into the top ten (though WKQI still outbilled WDRQ by a fair margin).

Clear Channel Communications took control of the station in 2000 when it merged with AMFM. In February of that year, Clear Channel formed a new morning show called Mojo in the Morning and began to target a younger audience demographic. WDRQ continued to win the CHR battle against WKQI for a few more years.

=== Channel 955 ===
On February 4, 2002, at 10 a.m., Clear Channel re-launched WKQI as "Channel 9-5-5" (later stylized as "Channel 955") and began to move the station in a more rhythmic direction to compete more directly with WDRQ. WKQI would soon take the ratings lead over WDRQ, whose falling ratings culminated in its format switch to "Variety Hits" as "Doug-FM" on April 1, 2005, leaving WKQI to have the CHR market to itself in Detroit. Subsequently, WKQI reclaimed its top 10 showing in Detroit's Arbitron ratings.

The station currently competes for the CHR audience with Cumulus Media's Hot AC-formatted WDVD, and CIDR-FM across the river in Windsor.

In February 2020, WKQI and its parent company iHeartMedia celebrated the 20th anniversary of the Mojo In The Morning show with a weeklong on-air celebration featuring celebrity guests and visits from cast members of the show's past. It was noted that the show earned the distinction of being the longest-running FM morning program in Michigan history.

WKQI currently ranks at #6 (5.0) in the Detroit market according to the May 2022 PPM ratings release.

In 2024, WKQI's logo changed to blue, coinciding with the Detroit Lions' playoff run that season.

=== HD Radio ===
In 2008, WKQI's HD2 subchannel began carrying the Dance Top 40 Club Phusion format, which is part of Clear Channel's Format Lab. It previously aired a "New CHR" format. WKQI billed Club Phusion as "Bomb Squad Radio" (named after its own stable of club DJs). The station later switched to an alternate dance mix-show format from Clear Channel's iHeartRadio on its HD-2 signal, known as "Spin Cycle Radio", which features continuous mix-show programming from a nationwide stable of club DJs. WKQI also formerly offered Clear Channel's Pride Radio format, featuring a mix of mostly dance music oriented toward the LGBT audience, on an HD3 subchannel. As of October 2015, WKQI-HD2 now carries another iHeartRadio format called "Feel tha Funk" (which was later renamed "Classic Funk"), featuring 1970s and 80s funk and soul music. WKQI-HD2 and HD3 have since begun simulcasting WKQI-HD1.

== See also ==
- Media in Detroit
