= CIMX-FM =

Radio station in Windsor, Ontario

- Windsor, Ontario; Canada
- Broadcast area: Southwestern Ontario; Detroit–Windsor
- Frequency: 88.7 MHz
- Branding: 89X

Programming
- Language: English
- Format: Modern rock

Ownership
- Owner: Bell Media; (Bell Media Windsor Radio Partnership)
- Sister stations: CIDR-FM, CKLW

History
- First air date: July 10, 1967
- Former call signs: CKWW-FM (1967–1970); CJOM-FM (1970–1990)
- Call sign meaning: Station formerly branded as "Mix"

Technical information
- Class: C1
- ERP: 78,200 watts average 100,000 watts peak
- HAAT: 188.5 metres (618 ft)
- Transmitter coordinates: 42°10′14.88″N 82°59′29.01″W

Links
- Webcast: Listen Live
- Website: 89xradio.com

CIMX-FM (88.7 FM, "89X") is a radio station in Windsor, Ontario. Owned by Bell Media, it broadcasts a modern rock format. Its studios and offices are located on Ouellette Avenue in Windsor, while its transmitter is located off Smith Industrial Drive in Amherstburg.

CIMX has an effective radiated power (ERP) of 78,200 watts, with a maximum of 100,000 watts; it primarily serves the Detroit–Windsor metropolitan area, and surrounding areas of Ontario (Essex County and Chatham-Kent), Michigan (Ann Arbor) and Ohio (Toledo).

== History ==
=== CKWW-FM ===
What is now CIMX first signed on the air on July 10, 1967, as CKWW-FM. It was co-owned with CKWW but was separately programmed. The stations shared studios and offices at 1150 Ouellette Avenue.

CKWW-FM had an MOR/easy listening format. The station added evening progressive rock programming in the fall of 1970.

=== Om FM ===
The following April, the station changed its call sign to CJOM-FM and the progressive format went full-time. Om FM (pronounced "Ohm FM") distinguished itself from its Detroit competitors WRIF, WWWW and WABX by emphasizing Canadian talent.

By 1976, the album rock sounds of "Om FM" had faded away and the station was again programming MOR and easy listening music.

=== Top 40 era ===
In 1982, CJOM and CKWW were acquired by Geoff Stirling's company, Stirling Communications International, which also owned CKGM in Montreal, Quebec and CHOZ-FM in St. John's, Newfoundland and Labrador. CJOM made an abrupt switch to a CHR/Top 40 format. In the evening hours, from 1983 until 1985, DJ Karen Evans played more alternative music with an introduction of British new wave music to the market. In the late 1980s, the station went by the moniker "Laser Rock," a reference to becoming one of the first radio stations in the Detroit area to program music solely from compact discs.

CJOM ran afoul of the CRTC in the summer of 1983 for its format change to CHR/Top 40. Then as now, all radio station format changes in Canada must be approved by the CRTC. CJOM had been approved for a "contemporary MOR" (what is now considered to be an adult contemporary) format, but analyses of the station's programming in May 1983 showed that almost all of the music being played was rock-oriented, that the station was playing 78% "hit" music rather than the allowed <50%, and that the station was not meeting its licence commitments for "foreground", "mosaic", spoken word, or news programming.

Stirling maintained that the station was "experimenting" with its programming and that such a format was necessary in order to make the station competitive with Detroit-based broadcasters. Stirling and the CRTC finally reached a compromise in August 1985. CJOM was granted an "experimental" licence which would enable the station to play more harder-edged rock and pop music with higher repetition, although a proposal to reduce the station's Canadian Content quotient to 5% from 15% was denied.

Under this experimental licence, CJOM remained a CHR-formatted radio station for most of the rest of the decade. Most rock songs played were Top 40 based like songs from Def Leppard and Billy Squier or Canadian artists such as Platinum Blonde, Haywire, and Gino Vannelli. CJOM would occasionally include several songs by one artist in a "star set" during the day. On Sunday evenings, CJOM would broadcast an "album countdown" in which the station would play several songs from the same album in the countdown.

=== Studios and tower ===
In 1987, CJOM increased its transmitting power to 100,000 watts from a tower in McGregor. Before this, the station's signal did not extend much further than the Detroit/Windsor area, and the station's Detroit area ratings were minimal.

The station's studios changed a few times in the years. It was originally located in the Macabee's Building next to the Wandalyn Viscount Hotel on Ouellette Avenue between Erie Street and Giles Boulevard. In late 1982, CJOM and CKNW moved to the Bob Pedler Building, located on Cabana Road East near Howard Avenue in the southern part of Windsor. Eventually, the station relocated to the former "Big 8" CKLW building, at the corner of Ouellette Avenue and Tecumseh Road West, when CHUM Limited purchased the station.

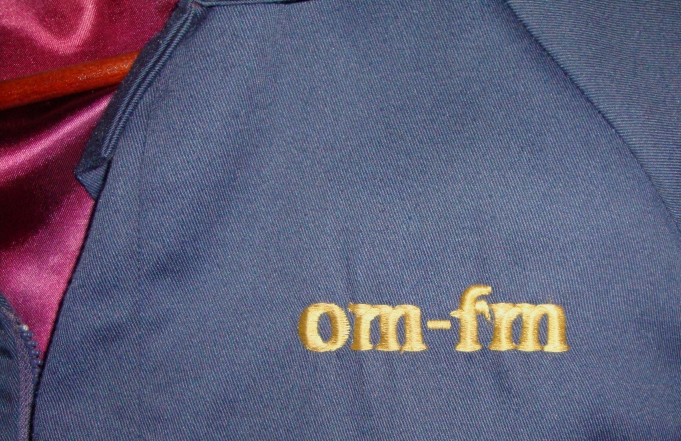
Station logo circa 1982, on employees' jackets

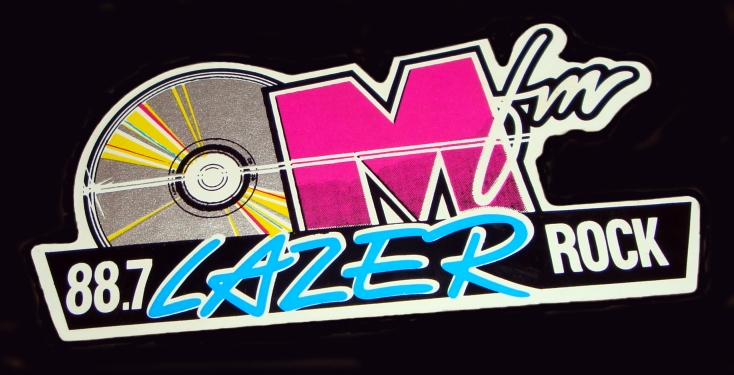
Station public promo decal mid-1980s

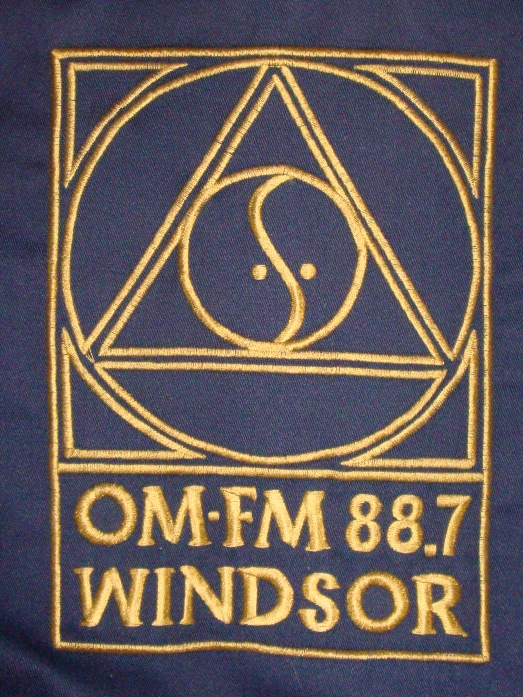
Rear of employees' jackets, while Stirling owned the station

=== The Mix to 89X ===
CJOM-FM became CIMX-FM in 1989. CIMX was first known as The Mix with an adult contemporary format, but disc jockey Greg St. James began playing modern rock on his evening show (8 p.m. to midnight) beginning in September 1990. This program was called "The Cutting Edge" and was eventually hosted by four different DJs, Greg St. James, Darren Revell, Michelle Denomme and Mr. Vertical.

At 4 p.m. on May 30, 1991, the modern rock format went full-time and 89X was born. The first (and ultimately, the last) song on "89X" was "Stop!" by Jane's Addiction. CIMX-FM immediately took away many listeners from other youth-oriented stations in Detroit, particularly WHYT and WDFX, and may have been at least partially responsible for WHYT's decision to switch to an alternative format a few years later.

This decal shows the station's updated logo after its change to Modern Rock in 1991.

CIMX-FM's long-running logo from 1999 to 2018

89X logo from 2018 to 2020

CIMX had been owned by Canada's CHUM Limited since August 1985, but was sold along with the rest of CHUM's radio stations to CTVglobemedia in 2007. Its sister station, CIDR-FM, adopted an adult album alternative format in 2006, with CIMX adding more active rock songs to its playlist and go up against WRIF. Throughout the 2000s, the format moved between alternative rock and active rock, with the station playing more metal rock than might be found on other alternative stations.

In the February 29, 2012, issue of Real Detroit Weekly, 89X was rated the best radio station in Detroit. Real Detroit Weekly also crowned 89X's own Jay Hudson the best DJ in Detroit for the fourth consecutive year.

On March 30, 2017, Bell Media announced that it would close its US-based sales office in Bingham Farms, canceled CIMX's morning show "Cal & Co.", and laid off around a dozen people as part of a restructuring of its Windsor cluster. After the changes, CIMX began to once again experience more of an active rock lean. On April 3, 2017, CIMX debuted their new morning show The Morning X, hosted by long-time personality and music director Mark McKenzie.

=== Pure Country 89 ===
Logo as Pure Country 89, 2020-2025

On November 18, 2020, Bell announced on the 89X website that CIMX would adopt a new format the next day at noon; concurrently, the station's on air staff was let go. At that time, CIMX flipped to country as Pure Country 89, launching with 10,000 songs in a row commercial-free. In anticipation of the format change, Entercom flipped its Detroit station WDZH from soft adult contemporary to modern rock as Alt 98.7 almost immediately afterward. The format competed locally with CJWF-FM, as well as with Detroit's WYCD. In other nearby markets, it competed with WWWW in Ann Arbor.

The station carried networked programming shared with other Pure Country-branded stations, including The Bobby Bones Show. Unlike the other Pure Country stations (which aired it in the evening), CIMX also cleared Bobby Bones in its normal morning timeslot in lieu of producing a local morning show.

=== Return of 89X ===
On August 21, 2025, radio news outlet RadioInsight reported that Bell, in addition to keeping the 89XRadio.com domain, had recently registered the .ca equivalent and 89Xfm.com; they had speculated the 89X format would return with a classic alternative format. By that time, the "Pure Country" format had begun to run with a skeleton crew, parting ways with its local talent with both morning show producer Nate Carr and afternoon host Chris Byrne exiting the station. All remaining programming, including Bobby Bones, would be automated or nationally syndicated by this point in the format's run.

On August 25, the reports would be confirmed, as CIMX began stunting, dropping all references to the "Pure Country" branding and running sweepers voiced in Spanish (in an apparent reference to the spoken-word intro of "Stop!") promoting that a "revolution" would bring "Canada's greatest export" and "something familiar" back to the station at 8:08 a.m. on August 28. At that time, after a set of Johnny Cash songs with relations to alternative music (including his covers of alternative rock songs such as "Hurt" by Nine Inch Nails, and his alternative country song "The Man Comes Around"), CIMX flipped back to modern rock and the 89X branding, once again playing "Stop!" as its first song. It was then followed by "Lose Yourself" by Eminem and "All the Small Things" by Blink 182, which were both preceded by sweepers featuring their performers (Eminem, and Blink 182 lead singer Mark Hoppus) discussing how CIMX was the first station in the Windsor–Detroit area to play their music. Unlike the previous iteration of 89X, the new iteration of the format is being marketed exclusively towards the Canadian portion of the market, with the station promoting itself as "Windsor's Alternative". The station also competes with Detroit's WDZH across the border.

== Live events ==
In addition to the various annual shows, the station held many acoustic "Live-X" events when bands come to town. The acoustic renditions have even been used by many of the bands, including Soundgarden's re-release of King Animal, "King Animal Plus," when the band performed their song "Halfway There."

89X celebrated its first birthday in May 1992 by holding two X-Fest shows. Peter Murphy, the Nymphs, Senseless Things were a few of the bands that played X-Fest. Then in 1993, 89X held a birthday show at Chene Park featuring the Tragically Hip. The next year, 1994, 89X started throwing annual "Birthday Bash" shows. The Birthday Bash in 1994 was held at the Phoenix Plaza Amphitheater during the World Cup competitions in Pontiac. The Afghan Whigs, Beck, and the Odds were some of the bands that played.

Notable 89X Shows
Year	Event	Bands
1993	89X Fest	The Breeders, Liz Phair, Urge Overkill, Majesty Crush, Alex Chilton, Walt Mink, Bricks, Charm Farm, 13 Engines, The Goldentones, and Brotherhood Recipe
1994	89X Fest	311, Weezer, MC 900 Ft. Jesus, Morphine, Veruca Salt, The Figgs, Big Chief, Forehead Stew, Tyrone’s Power Wheel, and Big Block
1998	The Night 89X Stole Christmas	Garbage, Placebo, Beck, Everlast, Marcy's Playground, and Kid Rock was the MC.
1999	The 89X Birthday Bash	Staind, Limp Bizkit, and Kid Rock
2000	The 89X Birthday Bash	Deftones, Eve 6, Uncle Kracker, Joydrop, and Elwood
2001	The 89X Birthday Bash	Puddle of Mudd, Staind, Sum 41, The Mighty Mighty Bosstones, Rehab, Cold, and Dope
2002	The 89X Birthday Bash	Dashboard Confessional, Our Lady Peace, Sloan, X-Ecutioners, and Quarashi
2003	The 89X Birthday Bash	Three Days Grace, Staind, The Used, Finch, CKY, and The Fags
2004	The 89X Birthday Bash	Dashboard Confessional, Motion City Soundtrack, Thrice, and The Get Up Kids
2006	The Night 89X Stole Christmas	My Chemical Romance, Taking Back Sunday, Angels & Airwaves, OK Go, and The Hard Lessons
2007	The Night 89X Stole Christmas	Paramore and Jimmy Eat World, Mutemath. Coheed and Cambria and Plain White T's
2008	The Night 89X Stole Christmas	Fall Out Boy, The Red Jumpsuit Apparatus, The Academy Is..., and Innerpartysystem
2009	The 89X Birthday Bash	Incubus & The Duke Spirit
2009	The Night 89X Stole Christmas	Thirty Seconds to Mars, Flyleaf, Thousand Foot Krutch, The Veer Union, and After Midnight Project
2010	The 89X Birthday Bash	Sublime With Rome, The Dirty Heads, Paper Tongues, Neon Trees, and Civil Twilight
2010	The Night 89X Stole Christmas	My Chemical Romance, and also featured Sick Puppies and Middle Class Rut
2011	The 89X Birthday Bash	Blink 182, My Chemical Romance, and Matt and Kim
2011	The Night 89X Stole Christmas	Rise Against, Taking Back Sunday, and Awolnation
2012	The 89X Birthday Bash	Evanescence, Chevelle, Cavo, and Kaleido
2012	The Night 89X Stole Christmas	The Killers and Tegan & Sara
2013	The 89X Birthday Bash	Day 1: Hollywood Undead, Escape The Fate, Middle Class Rut, 3 Pill Morning, and Chaos Rains Day 2: 311, Cypress Hill, G. Love & Special Sauce, and Iamdynamite
2013	Cal & Co. and 89X 'Chill On The Hill'	Day 1: A Day To Remember, Pierce The Veil, All Time Low, and The Wonder Years Day 2: Thirty Seconds to Mars, Billy Talent, Biffy Clyro, and New Politics
2013	The 89X Nutcracker	
2013	The Night 89X Stole Christmas	Cage The Elephant, Blue October, Foals, and Iamdynamite
2014	The 89X Birthday Bash	Kings Of Leon, Kongos, and Ashes of Soma
2014	89X and Bud Light 'Chill On The Hill'	Day 1: The Offspring, A Day To Remember, Bad Religion, Grouplove, Portugal The Man, Sleeper Agent, The Bots, Smashing Satellites and more. Day 2: Rise Against, Chevelle, Awolnation, Taking Back Sunday, USS, Brick + Mortar, The Orwells, Skaters, and more.
2014	The Night 89X Stole Xmas	Bush, Our Lady Peace, You Me At Six, and Smashing Satellites
2015	The 89X Birthday Bash	Death Cab For Cutie and The Antlers
2015	89X and Bud Light 'Chill On The Hill'	Day 1: Weezer, Panic! at the Disco, Andrew McMahon in the Wilderness, We Came As Romans, Thousand Foot Krutch, Beartooth, The Wombats, Night Riots, Vinyl Theater, Coleman Hell, and Arkells. Day 2: Cage The Elephant, Coheed And Cambria, Cold War Kids, JR JR, Robert Delong, X Ambassadors, The Glorious Sons, Civil Twilight, The Struts, Kaleido, and Five Hundredth Year.
2015	The Night 89X Stole Xmas	Day 1: Awolnation, Metric, and PVRIS Day 2: Sublime With Rome, USS (band), MuteMath, and Autumn Kings
2017	Mark McKenzie's Birthday Bash	Royal Tusk, The Standstills, and Texas King
