= WDZH =

Alternative rock radio station in Detroit

- Detroit, Michigan; United States
- Broadcast area: Metro Detroit
- Frequency: 98.7 MHz (HD Radio)
- Branding: Alt 98-7

Programming
- Language: English
- Format: Alternative rock
- Subchannels: HD2: Channel Q
- Affiliations: Detroit Pistons

Ownership
- Owner: Audacy, Inc.; (Audacy License, LLC)
- Sister stations: WOMC; WWJ; WXYT; WXYT-FM; WYCD

History
- First air date: 1961; 65 years ago
- Former call signs: WBFG (1961–1980); WLLZ (1980–1996); WVMV (1996–2010)
- Call sign meaning: "Detroit's Hits" (previous format used from 2009 to 2018)

Technical information
- Licensing authority: FCC
- Facility ID: 25448
- Class: B
- ERP: 50,000 watts
- HAAT: 141 meters (463 ft)
- Transmitter coordinates: 42°23′42″N 83°08′58″W

Links
- Public license information: Public file; LMS
- Webcast: Listen live (via Audacy)
- Website: www.audacy.com/alt987detroit

WDZH (98.7 FM, "Alt 98-7") is a commercial radio station licensed to Detroit, Michigan and serving the Metropolitan Detroit radio market in Southeastern Michigan. It is owned by Audacy, Inc. and airs an alternative rock radio format.

The station's offices and studios are located on American Drive in Southfield. The transmitter is located near Lyndon Street at Cloverdale Street in the City of Detroit. WDZH broadcasts with an effective radiated power (ERP) of 50,000 watts from an antenna at 463 feet in height above average terrain (HAAT).

== History ==
=== WBFG (1961–1980) ===
The station signed on the air in 1961 as WBFG ("We Broadcast For God"). The station broadcast religious programming for nearly two decades and was owned by the Trinity Broadcasting Corporation (not connected with the current-day Trinity Broadcasting Network).

Studios were located on Lyndon Avenue. The station sold segments of time to local and national religious leaders, who presented religious instruction and also sought donations on the air to support their ministry.

=== WLLZ, Detroit's Wheels (1980–1995) ===
On July 16, 1980, WBFG was sold to Doubleday Broadcasting Co., a subsidiary of publisher Doubleday and Company, which owned a number of radio stations around the U.S. Doubleday soon changed the call sign to WLLZ. The call letters stood for "Detroit's WheeLLZ," since Detroit is the home of the American auto industry. On August 11, 1980, at 5:07 p.m., WLLZ debuted a new AOR/CHR format. The first song played on the new "Detroit's Wheels" was "Let It Rock" by Bob Seger.

The new WLLZ became an instant hit. "Wheels" had one of the most successful premieres in Detroit radio history. It debuted at #2 (behind only WJR) in total persons 12+ in the Fall 1980 Arbitron ratings for Detroit radio. It also posted #1 ratings in the teen, 18-34 and 18-49 listener demographics. Detroit's other rockers were hit hard, particularly 106.7 WWWW (W4), which, having been a top 10-rated station just a year earlier (and had ranked as high as #2 in the spring 1979 ratings), had tumbled completely out of the top 20 by the fall of 1980. In January 1981, just days after the fall Arbitron ratings were released, W4 changed formats from rock to country music, and terminated morning man Howard Stern, whose show had been crushed by his WLLZ competition of John Larson and Jeff Young.

The rock format on WABX also was switched for a Top 40/CHR format in 1982, leaving WLLZ and WRIF to go head-to-head in the AOR format for the rest of the 1980s and into the early 1990s, with WLLZ occasionally beating the heritage rocker in the 12+ ratings. In an Ann Arbor News article in 1987, Michael Solon, the station's general manager at the time of the rock format's launch, credited WLLZ's success to the perception that the station featured less chatter and took a more mass-appeal, hit-oriented approach to its rock music than competing stations: "It was a wonderful time, making such a splash with an all-new station. I was no genius. I just figured that if the other stations were awfully chatty and going four songs deep on albums, we would do well by playing album-music hits." In April 1986, Legacy Broadcasting bought WLLZ.

In 1988, WLLZ also introduced the nation's first weekly sports talk show on an FM rock and roll station, The Sunday Sports Albom, hosted by Mitch Albom. In December 1989, Westinghouse Broadcasting bought the station. (Westinghouse was merged into CBS in 1995, with the radio division being renamed Infinity Broadcasting in 1997).

WLLZ saw its fortunes slip in the early 1990s with the emergence of "alternative rock" groups like Nirvana and Pearl Jam, which drove many of the 1980s "hair bands" off the charts. A format tweak from AOR to modern rock in June 1995 (which put the station in competition with 89X and The Planet 96.3) failed to reverse the station's dropping ratings.

=== Smooth Jazz V98.7 (1995–2009) ===
V98.7 logo 2001-2009

On December 20, 1995, at 10 a.m., after playing Led Zeppelin's "Stairway To Heaven", WLLZ flipped to Smooth Jazz as V98.7. The format was introduced by musician Kenny G, followed by the first song: "Smooth Operator" by Sade. The WVMV call letters were adopted on February 16, 1996.

The flip put the station in competition with the similarly formatted WJZZ, until the latter flipped to urban in August 1996.

In December 2005, WVMV's parent company, Infinity Broadcasting, was renamed CBS Radio.

=== 98-7 AMP Radio (2009–2018) ===
AMP logo (2009–2013)

AMP logo (2013–2018)

At 5 p.m. on October 2, 2009, after almost fifteen years as a smooth jazz station, "V98.7" signed off with the first song the station played in December 1995, "Smooth Operator" by Sade. The station then briefly stunted by playing a montage of jingles and airchecks of WLLZ, claiming that "Detroit's Wheelz" was back on the air, following up by playing "Welcome To The Jungle" by Guns N' Roses. Halfway through the song, it was interrupted by the audio of Kanye West's famous "Imma let you finish" scene from the 2009 MTV Video Music Awards (with new station voiceover announcer Dr. Dave Ferguson responding by saying "Uh, OK. Then we'll play Beyoncé."), followed by Beyoncé's "Sweet Dreams", and officially flipped to Top 40. Instead of revealing the name of the new format, WVMV was branded for that weekend as "98.7 Takeover", inviting listeners to register online and guess what the name of the new station was going to be. The winner of the contest would be awarded $1,000, and the real name would be revealed at 8 a.m. the following Monday, October 5. At that time, the station officially launched as 98.7 AMP Radio, modeled after sister stations KAMP-FM in Los Angeles, and WBMP in New York City. Unlike those two stations, WVMV did not start with 10,000 songs commercial free, instead offering commercial-free Mondays, which were discontinued in April 2011. The station adopted the WDZH call sign on May 3, 2010.

The "AMP Radio" format featured a tight rotation of mainly current hits, similar to Mike Joseph's Hot Hits formatted stations of the late 1970s and early 1980s, which had been heard locally on WHYT.

On February 2, 2017, CBS Radio announced it would merge with Entercom. The merger was approved on November 9, 2017, and was consummated on November 17.

=== 98.7 The Breeze (2018–2020) ===
"98.7 The Breeze" logo (2018–2020)

Shortly after 5:00 p.m. on November 9, 2018, midway through the song "Drew Barrymore" by SZA, WDZH began stunting with Christmas music as The Rudolph Network at 98.7. Initially believed to run through the holiday season, the stunt abruptly ended at 5:00 p.m. on November 12, as the station flipped to a soft adult contemporary format as 98.7 The Breeze, launching with a commercial-free marathon of 10,000 songs, starting with "Baby, What a Big Surprise" by Chicago. The station competed primarily with iHeartMedia's mainstream AC WNIC; it is likely the suddenness of the flip was intended to catch WNIC off-guard, as the station is known for running Christmas music through the holiday season and had already done so ahead of the Breeze's launch.

Beginning in 2019 and ending the following year, WDZH carried Christmas music for the holiday season, replacing sister station WOMC as Entercom's home for the programming within its Detroit cluster. As with its main format, it competed primarily with WNIC, which, as mentioned above, has historically been the most prominent station for Christmas music in Detroit.

=== Alt 98-7 (2020–present) ===
"Alt 98.7" logo under previous slogan

On November 19, 2020, at 12:00 p.m., in the midst of its all-Christmas programming, WDZH abruptly flipped to modern rock as Alt 98.7; the flip occurred concurrently with Windsor station CIMX-FM 89X dropping its long-running modern rock format in favor of country music (as part of a dual-flip with sister station CIDR-FM to take on Bell Media's standardized country and CHR formats). WDZH currently features on-air talent exclusively from sister stations around the United States.

Such a move had been rumored to take place since shortly after Entercom took over the station in November 2017, as Entercom had flipped several other "Amp Radio" branded stations across the country to the format, including the aforementioned WNYL, shortly after their merger with CBS Radio; however, rival iHeartMedia pulled a preemptive move around that same time, flipping WDTW-FM (now WLLZ) to the format and its own "Alt" branding with little warning.

During late December 2021, the station (and many of Audacy's other alternative stations across the U.S.) began tweaking the playlist away from a current-heavy presentation and adding more alternative rock-based tracks from the 1990s and 2000s. Until September 2021, the station aired the syndicated "Cane & Corey" morning show from WNYL in New York. Until August 2022, the station aired the syndicated "Church of Lazlo" afternoon show from KRBZ in Kansas City. The station now focuses heavily on music over personality. Only the morning drive has a local DJ. The rest of the lineup is voice tracked from other markets.

== HD radio ==
"Area 9-8-7" HD3 logo

"V 98.7" HD2 logo

On January 20, 2006, the station launched its HD2 sub-channel with a Traditional Jazz format. After the change to Top 40 (CHR) on FM on October 2, 2009, the station moved its Smooth Jazz format to the HD2 sub-channel as Smooth Jazz V98.7, with one live host from 9am-5pm, Madisun Leigh, who had done mornings on WVMV in the early 2000s. Former WVMV morning host Alexander Zonjic also hosted Alexander Zonjic from A to Z on Fridays and Sundays from 7 pm to 8 pm.

On March 28, 2014, the station activated its HD3 sub-channel, and began airing a modern rock format, branded as Area 9-8-7, The Real Alternative. In April 2016, WDZH-HD3 flipped to Rhythmic Adult Contemporary as Party 98-7. In August 2019, WDZH-HD3 flipped to "Channel Q," Entercom's Talk/EDM service for the LGBTQ community. Channel Q eventually moved to HD2 which resulted in the HD3 subchannel being turned off.
