= Big Sonic Heaven =

Big Sonic Heaven is a 24/7 Internet radio station and blog created, hosted and produced by Darren Revell.

The first chapter of Big Sonic Heaven had an eight-year run from 1995-2003 on Detroit, Michigan, radio station WPLT (now WDVD). Big Sonic Heaven aired every Sunday evening for four hours and featured shoegaze, dream pop, trip hop, Britpop, and electronic by bands such as Cocteau Twins, My Bloody Valentine, Dead Can Dance, Portishead (band), Depeche Mode, Ride, Slowdive, The Cure, Hooverphonic, Siouxsie and the Banshees, and The Smiths to name a few. Additionally, Revell was instrumental in providing local talent with a radio presence. Revell made a significant impact in Detroit with the program, as there were very few radio shows that catered to this genre and its fans.

Revell revived Big Sonic Heaven on Los Angeles, California, radio station Indie 103.1 in January 2007. The two-hour program aired Mondays through Thursdays at 10 p.m. On January 15, 2009, Indie 103.1 went off the air.

On September 12, 2010, Big Sonic Heaven returned to the airwaves via the Internet on Strangeways Radio. The show briefly aired from 9-11 p.m. Eastern Time on Sunday nights.

In May 2013, Revell launched bigsonicheaven.com, where Big Sonic Heaven podcasts could be streamed.

On March 10, 2020, Revell launched the Big Sonic Heaven 24/7 Internet radio station via bigsonicheaven.com with free iPhone & Android mobile apps. Big Sonic Heaven is now heard worldwide 24 hours-a-day with Revell hosting new & classic Big Sonic Heaven music, commercial-free.

On November 16, 2025, Big Sonic Heaven returned to the airwaves with live broadcasts on WDET-FM on Sunday evenings from 9pm - 12am local time. This marks the show's return to live radio in Detroit after 22 years.
