= WYCD =

Country music radio station in Detroit

- Detroit, Michigan; United States
- Broadcast area: Metro Detroit
- Frequency: 99.5 MHz (HD Radio)
- Branding: New Country 99-5 YCD

Programming
- Format: country music
- Affiliations: United Stations Radio Networks

Ownership
- Owner: Audacy, Inc.; (Audacy License, LLC)
- Sister stations: WDZH; WOMC; WWJ; WXYT; WXYT-FM

History
- First air date: May 4, 1960
- Former call signs: WABX (1960–1984); WCLS (1984–1985); WDTX (1985–1988); WDFX (1988–1992); WOWF (1992–1993)
- Call sign meaning: "Young Country Detroit"

Technical information
- Licensing authority: FCC
- Facility ID: 1089
- Class: B
- ERP: 17,500 watts
- HAAT: 240 meters (790 ft)
- Transmitter coordinates: 42°27′13″N 83°09′50″W

Links
- Public license information: Public file; LMS
- Webcast: Listen live (via Audacy)
- Website: www.audacy.com/wycd

WYCD (99.5 FM, "New Country 99-5 YCD") is a commercial radio station licensed to Detroit, Michigan. It airs a country music radio format, and is owned by Audacy, Inc. WYCD's offices and studios are on American Drive in Southfield, Michigan.

WYCD has an effective radiated power (ERP) of 17,500 watts, its transmitter, is on Radio Plaza in Ferndale. WYCD broadcasts using HD Radio technology.

== History ==
=== WCAR-FM and WABX ===
In 1948, the 99.5 FM frequency was used by WCAR-FM in Pontiac, Michigan, it was the FM sister station of WCAR (now WDFN). In 1956, WCAR moved from Pontiac to Detroit, however few people owned FM radios in that era, so the FM signal was dropped, leaving 99.5 FM open in Detroit.

The 99.5 frequency returned to the air on May 4, 1960, as WABX, which began as a classical music station. It switched to Middle of the Road music in 1964. For a short period beginning in August 1967, the station adopted an all-female disc jockey staff during the day, in an era when women were rarely heard on the radio. They played jazz-oriented pop music and humorous bits. The idea came from Mickey Shorr, who was program manager and creative director of Century Broadcasting Corp., the station's owner.

During the fall of 1967, WABX began airing a new music show called "Troubadour" from 7 to 8 pm, hosted by station manager John Small. The show featured blues, folk music and rock music. During this time, WABX was still airing an MOR format, with an emphasis on jazz-influenced music from artists like Frank Sinatra, Nat King Cole, Mel Tormé, Nancy Wilson and Joe Williams.

=== Progressive Rock ===
The strong, positive response generated by "Troubadour" was enough to convince the station's owners to adopt a full-time freeform progressive rock format. On February 1, 1968, a playlist of acceptable tunes went out: the DJs picked their own music, and Century Broadcasting Corporation bit its tongue. With a progressive rock format, WABX became a springboard for the new music that no other station in the market aired. During the 1960s, the top music stations were WJR, with its MOR format, and CKLW, the Top 40 leader.

The ABX revolution was one of style as well as sound. The station made itself a community catalyst for fun: free concerts and movies, kite-flying and bike-ins. The station played a role in giving many artists the recognition that they did not have at the time, including The Doors, Jimi Hendrix, Cream, Iron Butterfly, and The Who. The success of WABX inspired other Detroit stations such as WKNR-FM and WXYZ-FM to adopt the progressive-rock approach. One of the WABX DJs was "Air Ace" Dave Dixon, himself a musician who co-wrote the Peter, Paul and Mary hit "I Dig Rock and Roll Music."

=== Album-Oriented Rock ===
During the 1970s, WABX evolved into a more mainstream album oriented rock (AOR) station playing the biggest selling albums. WABX took a softer, more laid-back approach than its competitors. The station was branded as "WABX 99" during this era with a logo featuring yellow lettering on a black background. The station's studio moved from its original location in the David Stott Building in downtown Detroit to a new facility in suburban Oak Park during this period.

By 1982, WABX was third in the ratings out of three album rock stations in Detroit (behind WRIF and WLLZ). Century Broadcasting sold the station to Liggett Broadcasting that year. Under new program director Paul Christy, WABX shifted from album rock to "Hot Rock," a Top 40/rock hybrid, known on the air as "Detroit's New Music." It played a wide variety of new wave, pop, rock and urban product with a slick, CHR-style presentation. However, the station's market share continued to decline throughout 1983. A little over a year after WABX debuted "Hot Rock," Liggett decided to change the station's format and call letters.

=== Class FM/99 DTX/99.5 The Fox ===
On January 9, 1984, WABX's era as a rock station came to an end with the song "When the Music's Over" by The Doors. The station then became "Class FM", WCLS, with a soft adult contemporary format. However, the adult contemporary field in Detroit was as crowded as the rock format had been, and "Class FM" was not successful. Around this time, Liggett sold the station to Metropolis Broadcasting.

The following year between 1985 and 1986, the station became WDTX, reverting to a rock-based Top 40/CHR format meant to be a radio version of MTV. Eventually, the format evolved into mainstream CHR. However, its success against CHR rivals WCZY and WHYT was limited. During this period, DJ's would play extended 12" remixes of popular songs at the time, as well as relatively obscure synth-pop, hip-hop, new wave, alternative, and various other genres.

On July 25, 1988, shortly after Hoker Broadcasting bought the station, WDTX changed its call letters to WDFX, and rebranded as "99.5 The Fox". Part of the branding for this format included a logo with red lettering and a fox tail coming off the letter X. A cartoon fox was featured on some logos wearing a checkered shirt reclining on "The Fox" logo while holding a keytar. Part of the station's formula also involved taking frequent on-air pot shots at competitors Z95.5 (referring to the station's previous identity as "Cozy FM" and for featuring too much talk) and Power 96 (referring to it as "Disco 96" for its rhythmic lean).

The station had a promising start, rocketing from 15th to third place 12+ in the fall 1988 Arbitron ratings report and leaping ahead of WCZY and WHYT to become the number one hit station in the market. The ratings then cooled off when The Fox tweaked its CHR format into "Rock 40," a variation of Top 40 heavy on hair bands and other rock-oriented acts. Afterwards, The Fox tweaked its format back to mainstream CHR, and at the same time, added some hip hop to compete with Power 96. (Z95.5 had left the CHR format by then to flip to an Adult Top 40 format.) Ratings improved and the station posted frequent Arbitron top 10 showings in the late 1980s and early 1990s. However, advertising revenue was poor and, in September 1990, the station went into receivership. In addition, WDFX's ratings were adversely affected (as were WHYT's) by the debut of modern rock station 89X in 1991. In August 1992, Alliance Broadcasting bought the station.

=== 99-5 Wow-FM ===
On December 24, 1992, WDFX started stunting by having a character named "Cowboy Hugh Chardon" (played by Dr. Don Carpenter) play "Friends in Low Places" by Garth Brooks repeatedly (for his good buddy Bobby Stalls in Birmingham) and try to kill "The Fox" using various methods suggested by "listeners". At midnight on Christmas Day, the station switched its stunting to an electronic Commodore 64 based text-to-speech voice counting down from 63,752 to number one on December 28. (This was apparently done so the staff could rebuild the studios.)

Instead of debuting a new format when the countdown ended, it stunted for another week with a six-hour loop of novelty songs they called "goofy loops" played repeatedly. This continued until the early morning of January 4, 1993 (the first Monday after New Years), when the station finally finished changing formats and became "99-5 Wow-FM" WOWF (the call letters had actually been in place since October 1992). It was a talk radio station with broadcasters such as Art Vuolo and Ed Tyll hosting shows. However, by popular demand, the "goofy loops" track was brought back at weekends for the life of the station.

WOWF promoted its talk format as an alternative to WWJ and WJR by touting the station's FM signal as clear and static-free, including using the Steely Dan song "FM (No Static at All)" in its promos. Station management described the format in radio trade papers as "hip full service," combining approaches of CNN and MTV/VH1, and avoided the label "news/talk" as it was thought that such a label branded the station as being "old" and "stodgy." However, the station could never make any significant inroads, and in less than five months' time, the talk format was abandoned.

=== Young Country/99.5 WYCD ===
On May 28, 1993, at 3 pm, the station abruptly dropped the talk format in favor of "Young Country", with the first song being "Small Town Saturday Night" by Hal Ketchum. With the change, the station switched its call letters to WYCD. Part of the branding for this format included the logo for "Young Country" with red and blue lettering and blue background and a star in the middle of the word "Young". Dr. Don Carpenter was one of the few air staffers (afternoons) who remained from the "Wow FM" format. Other personalities included in the original lineup were Jim "JD" Daniels and Katie Marroso (mornings), Mark Elliot (middays), Jyl Forsyth (nights) and Eddie Haskell (weekends). The DJ schedule was later shifted, with Doctor Don still in afternoons, Joe Wade Formicola in mornings, Jyl Forsyth in middays, Su-Anna in evenings and Brian Hatfield on overnights.

WYCD positioned itself as a younger-leaning alternative to crosstown W4 Country, which had been enjoying big ratings as the only country station in town. WYCD kept the personality elements from the previous "Wow FM" format and combined it with younger-sounding country music to create "Morning Shows" all day that highlighted listener calls, requests and fun jock talk. It was all a part of owner Alliance's "Young Country" concept that it had on the air in Dallas, Seattle, and San Francisco. While not a powerhouse in those days, WYCD was successful in its quest to cut into W4's sizable audience share, forcing WWWW to switch to a classic rock format in September 1999.

In September 1995, Alliance was bought out by Infinity Broadcasting. (Infinity was renamed CBS Radio in December 2005).

On February 16, 2001, WYCD dropped the "Young Country 99.5" moniker in favor of "Country 99.5".

During the 9/11 attacks, the station simulcasted news coverage from sister-stations WWJ-TV and WWJ (AM).

In April 2002, the station rebranded itself as "99.5 WYCD, Detroit's Best Country"; by June 2006, the station refined its branding to simply "99.5 WYCD."

With the country format all to itself in Detroit from 1999 to 2006, WYCD was consistently a Top 10-rated station. In the spring of 2006, WYCD had its best ratings book when it tied for first place 12+ with hip-hop station FM98 WJLB.

The high ratings at WYCD are probably what led WDTW-FM to switch formats back to country in May 2006. After three years of competing in the format, WDTW dropped country music for Rhythmic AC, due to low ratings, making WYCD once again the only country station in Detroit. Then, in December 2013, WDRQ flipped to the format as "Nash FM 93.1".

In 2007, WYCD was nominated for the top 25 markets Country music Radio & Records magazine station of the year award. Other nominees included WUSN Chicago, KYGO-FM Denver, KEEY-FM Minneapolis, WXTU Philadelphia, and KSON-FM San Diego.

In early 2017, WYCD was the first station in Michigan to add the "Country Fried Mix" with DJ Sinister to its lineup.

=== Entercom ownership ===
On February 2, 2017, CBS Radio announced it would merge with Entercom. The merger was approved on November 9, 2017, and was consummated on November 17. In 2021, Entercom changed its name to Audacy, Inc.

On January 2, 2020, WYCD tweaked its branding after 19 years to simply "99-5 YCD, Detroit's #1 For Country". On February 18, 2020, to combat against WDRQ's relaunch as "New Country 93-1," WYCD once again tweaked its branding to "New Country 99-5 YCD."

=== Downtown Hoedown ===
Since 2000, WYCD has been the hosts for one of the largest free country music festivals in the world. The Hoedown takes place one weekend every May in downtown Detroit's Hart Plaza. It is a major showcase of new upcoming artists as well as well recognised ones.

The Hoedown was established back in 1983 by former Detroit country outlet WCXI/WCXI-FM. Its first event featured artists like Hank Williams Jr., Tanya Tucker and Mel Tillis. This event soon would attract people from all across the country. When WCXI was sold by Gene Autry's Golden West Broadcasters to Shamrock Broadcasting, Shamrock's Detroit station W4 Country took over the event.

In May 2000, WYCD took over hosting the Hoedown. The station's first year hosting saw artists like Trace Adkins, Montgomery Gentry and Rascal Flatts. Over the years, the Hoedown has had its share of very well known artists kicking off their careers at the concert. Some of these include Reba McEntire, Luke Bryan, Travis Tritt, Toby Keith, and Lonestar, and in 1989, came an unknown artist by the name of Garth Brooks.

The audience at the event has always increased every year. In 2010, the Hoedown saw its biggest audience yet with over 1.3 million people showing up over the three-day period. 2010 would also be the last year the Downtown Hoedown was a free festival. In years after, WYCD would charge $25 to $30 for admittance.

In 2010, at the 28th annual Downtown Hoedown, WYCD welcomed nationally known recording artists Uncle Kracker, Zac Brown Band, Dierks Bentley, Darryl Worley and Justin Moore, among many others.

In 2012, due to a big audience, the Hoedown was relocated to in front of Comerica Park. In 2015, it was announced that it would be moving to West Riverfront Park and would be cut down to only two days.

In 2015, it was announced that it would move yet again, this time to DTE Energy Music Theater. The event will also be shortened to a 1-day concert on Sunday July 31, 2016. After moving to DTE Energy Music Theater, the "Downtown Hoedown" name was dropped and changed to "WYCD Hoedown" or "99.5 WYCD Hoedown".
