= WKEG =

Relevant Radio station in Sterling Heights–Detroit, Michigan

Sterling Heights, Michigan; United States
- Broadcast area: Metro Detroit
- Frequency: 1030 kHz
- Branding: Relevant Radio

Programming
- Format: Catholic radio
- Network: Relevant Radio

Ownership
- Owner: Relevant Radio, Inc.

History
- First air date: October 26, 1988
- Former call signs: WVLF (1988); WDRQ (1988); WUFL (1988–2023)

Technical information
- Licensing authority: FCC
- Facility ID: 20629
- Class: D
- Power: 5,000 watts (days only)
- Transmitter coordinates: 42°36′17″N 82°54′40″W
- Translators: 94.1 W231CV (Holly); 94.3 W232CA (Detroit); 103.1 W276DB (Rochester Hills); 104.7 W284BQ (Detroit)

Links
- Public license information: Public file; LMS
- Website: relevantradio.com

WKEG (1030 AM) is a non-commercial radio station licensed to Sterling Heights, Michigan, United States, and serving Metro Detroit. It is owned by Relevant Radio and runs its national Catholic format. WKEG only operates during the daytime hours but is relayed over four FM translator around the clock: 94.3 W232CA and 104.7 W284BQ in Detroit, 94.1 W231CV in Holly and 103.1 W276DB in Rochester Hills.

== History ==
The station signed on the air on October 26, 1988. It was the seventh station owned and operated by Family Life Communications (commonly referred to as FLR or Family Life Radio). It took the call sign WUFL. WUFL carried Family Life's Christian radio programming.

In November 2022, Family Life Radio announced would sell WUFL and its four FM translators to Relevant Radio, which is a Catholic broadcaster based in Wisconsin. The deal included the land that houses WUFL's transmitter but not the call sign, which would be transferred to another Family Life Radio property. (Note: Family Life Radio would return to Detroit in August 2023, when it acquired WDRQ (93.1 FM) and relaunched it as a new WUFL.)

The sale to Relevant Radio was consummated on February 28, 2023, at a price of $3.1 million. On March 2, 2023, AM 1030 changed its call sign to WKEG. In June 2023, Family Life Radio announced it would be buying an FM station in Detroit, 93.1 WDRQ. The sale was completed and the WUFL call letters were reassigned to the Detroit FM station.
