= Dick Purtan =

American radio personality (born 1936)

- Dick Purtan on air at the 23rd annual WOMC Radiothon for The Salvation Army Bed & Bread Club - Feb. 2010
- Born: July 11, 1936 (age 88)
- Occupation: American radio personality

Paul Richard Purtan (born July 11, 1936) is an American radio personality. His last radio job was as the morning radio show host on WOMC serving the Detroit, Michigan, radio market. Purtan was also a disc jockey at WKNR, WXYZ, CKLW, WCZY-FM which became WKQI in 1989 and WOMC from 1996 until his retirement in 2010. Previous to coming to Detroit at WKNR "Keener 13" in 1965, Purtan worked at WOLF in Syracuse, New York and WSAI in Cincinnati; he began his radio career in his hometown of Buffalo, New York at WWOL under the station-mandated name "Guy King" and also worked for a very short time at WBAL in Baltimore (only to be forced to leave the station after his witty, sardonic humor clashed with the station's conservative ownership).

== Career ==
Purtan is well known for his philanthropic work. Each year, Purtan and his "Purtan's People" crew host a radiothon to benefit the Salvation Army's "Bed and Bread" program. Through Purtan's efforts, over $30 million have been donated to the Bed and Bread program. The money has also been used to purchase additional Bed and Bread trucks which make daily deliveries of food to needy people in the Detroit area.

While in Cincinnati, Purtan gathered together $12,500 and promoted and emceed the Beatles in concert.

Purtan had a voice over role in Beverly Hills Cop III. He had a cameo role as a police detective in the 1973 film Detroit 9000.

On the morning of February 13, 2010, Purtan announced his retirement effective March 26, 2010.

He and his late wife, Gail, resided in West Bloomfield. As of 2014, he and one of his six daughters, Jackie, continue to keep up with his audience through his blog every weekday and Facebook. He also started producing a weekly podcast, which can run anywhere between 20 minutes and an hour and have had on various "Purtan People." His daughter Joanne was a newscaster on local WXYZ-TV Channel 7.

After losing his wife, Gail, of 60 years to cancer in 2018, Purtan remarried on June 13, 2020.

== Honors ==
- In 2004, Purtan was inducted into the National Radio Hall of Fame.
- Purtan was inducted into the National Association of Broadcasters Hall of Fame in the radio division in 2006.
