= WLQV =

Radio station in Detroit, Michigan

- Detroit, Michigan; United States
- Broadcast area: Detroit metropolitan area
- Frequency: 1500 kHz
- Branding: Faith Talk 101.5 & 1500

Programming
- Format: Christian talk and teaching
- Affiliations: SRN News

Ownership
- Owner: Salem Media Group; (Salem Communications Holding Corporation)
- Sister stations: WDTK

History
- First air date: October 7, 1925
- Former call signs: WJBK (1925–1970); WDEE (1970–1979); WLQV (1979–1985); WCZY (1985–1987)
- Call sign meaning: "Love"

Technical information
- Licensing authority: FCC
- Facility ID: 42081
- Class: B
- Power: 50,000 watts (day); 10,000 watts (night)
- Transmitter coordinates: 42°13′52″N 83°11′58″W
- Translator: 101.5 W268CN (Detroit)

Links
- Public license information: Public file; LMS
- Webcast: Listen live
- Website: faithtalkdetroit.com

WLQV (1500 AM) is a commercial radio station licensed to Detroit, Michigan. It is owned by the Salem Media Group and broadcasts a Christian radio format. Studios are on Radio Plaza in Royal Oak Township, Michigan, while the transmitter is in Lincoln Park, Michigan. Programming is also heard on 99-watt FM translator W268CN at 101.5 MHz in Detroit.

== History ==
=== WJBK ===
On October 7, 1925, the station first signed on the air. Its original call sign was WJBK and it was licensed to nearby Ypsilanti, broadcasting on 1290 kHz. The call letters were randomly assigned from a sequential roster of available call signs. Two years later, WJBK moved to 1360 kHz.

Following the establishment of the Federal Radio Commission (FRC), stations were initially issued a series of temporary authorizations starting on May 3, 1927. In addition, they were informed that if they wanted to continue operating, they needed to file a formal license application by January 15, 1928, as the first step in determining whether they met the new "public interest, convenience, or necessity" standard. On May 25, 1928, the FRC issued General Order 32, which notified 164 stations, including WJBK, that "From an examination of your application for future license it does not find that public interest, convenience, or necessity would be served by granting it." However, the station successfully convinced the commission that it should remain licensed.

On November 11, 1928, the FRC implemented a major reallocation of station transmitting frequencies, as part of a reorganization resulting from its implementation of General Order 40. WJBK was assigned to 1370 kHz.

In 1940, WJBK was re-licensed to Detroit, broadcasting on 1490 AM. It was owned by John F. Hopkins, with its studios at 6559 Hamilton Avenue.

An FM station at 93.1 was added in 1947, WJBK-FM (now WUFL). A TV station was launched the following year, WJBK-TV. In the late 1940s, WJBK was the home of one of Detroit's first radio disk jockeys, Ed McKenzie, known as "Jack the Bellboy". His late afternoon show combined the mainstream pop hits of the day with a good amount of R&B or "race" music as it was referred to at the time. It clicked with the young people and soon propelled him to #1 in the market. The station also launched the career of Casey Kasem, later the long-time host of American Top 40. ',n In 1954, WJBK moved to its current frequency at 1500 AM with 10,000 watts. By this time, Storer Broadcasting owned WJBK-AM-FM as well as WJBK-TV, Detroit's CBS-TV network affiliate. In 1956, WJBK became the first radio station in Detroit to feature the Top 40 format 24 hours a day. WJBK also published Detroit's first printed survey of the station's most popular songs for distribution at local record stores, dubbed "Formula 45" (which became the station's catchphrase). WJBK's chief competitor in the format during the late 1950s and early 1960s was WXYZ 1270 AM, and the two stations were frequently neck-and-neck in the ratings. Since WJBK had retained ownership of the "Jack the Bellboy" name after Ed McKenzie left the station, there were several more "Jack the Bellboy"s at Radio 15 during the late 1950s and early 1960s, including Tom Clay (known for creating a romantic aura on the air), Dave Shafer, Terry Knight and Robin Walker. Other popular WJBK personalities included longtime morning host Marc Avery, midday host Clark Reid and afternoon drive personality Robert E. Lee (who claimed to be an actual descendant of the legendary Confederate Civil War general and opened his show every afternoon with a "Rebel Yell").

In 1962, WJBK was granted a daytime power increase. It was powered at 50,000 watts by day and 5,000 watts at night.

Then, WKNR "Keener 13" was launched at 1310 AM on Halloween 1963, burying the Motor City's Top 40 competition - including WJBK. It featured a shorter playlist and a tighter, more energetic presentation than any other station in the market. WJBK gave up the fight in 1964 and switched to an easy listening music format. In 1966 the station tweaked to an early version of what would today be called Adult Contemporary, featuring a mix of adult Hot 100 chart hits from the likes of the Mamas & the Papas, B.J. Thomas, Nancy Sinatra and Bob Dylan, and select album cuts. Through the changes, ratings remained low. The station made a second attempt at Top 40 in 1969 with a lineup of disc jockeys that included K.O. Bayley, Lee 'Baby' Simms, Tom Dean, Jim Hampton and CKLW mainstay Tom Shannon, but it lasted only a few months.

The WJBK call letters are no longer used in radio; they were retained on WJBK-TV, now owned by Fox Television Stations; the "-TV" suffix was dropped in 1998 as a result.

=== WDEE ===
At midnight on December 26, 1969, WJBK flipped to a country music format and changed its call sign to WDEE. Many joked at the time that the call letters stood for "We've Done Everything Else". Former WJBK personality Marc Avery recalled in 1971, when interviewed for the WDRQ program "The History of Detroit Radio", that WJBK had been considering switching to country as far back as the early 1960s. At the time, 1340 WEXL (now WCHB) was the only full-time country music station in the immediate Detroit market. WDEE distinguished itself with its slick, contemporary ("countrypolitan") approach to the country format, designed for mass appeal, and was one of the first stations to program country and western music with a Top 40-style presentation. The move paid off with frequent top-five showings in the Detroit ratings during the 1970s.

With only a thousand watts of power, WEXL was unable to compete with 50,000-watt WDEE and left the country format by 1974 for religious programming. WDEE's midday show, "The Fem Forum", in which host Tom Dean fielded calls from female listeners sharing their sexual frustrations, was a controversial feature for its time but also quite popular. Other personalities on the station during the 1970s included morning mainstay Deano Day, Hank O'Neil, Mike Scott, Dave Williams, Bob Burchett, Ray Otis, Randy Price, Doug Smith, Don Thompson, Jimmy Bare, Rosalee, Paul Allen, Bob Day, Ron Ferris, Dan Dixon and Rick Church.

In the early 1970s, WDEE was purchased by Combined Communications, which in turn was purchased by the Gannett Company. (Previous to Combined ownership, WDEE was part of a broadcast chain owned by Globe Broadcasting, owned by the Harlem Globetrotters.) Also during this time, WDEE-FM changed to news/talk as WDRQ-FM. That lasted until 1972, when Charter Broadcasting bought WDRQ and switched to Top 40, using such memorable slogan as "I Q in My Car". Four decades and several formats later, that station was playing contemporary country music again, under Cumulus Media ownership as "Nash FM" until late 2023 when they were purchased by FLC and changed to a Christian music format.

The WDEE calls later had a brief revival as a daytime-only classic-country music station in Reed City, Michigan, coincidentally also at AM 1500. This station has since gone off the air, but the calls survive on its onetime FM sister station, WDEE-FM, which runs an oldies format as "Sunny 97.3".

=== WLQV/WCZY ===
In early 1979, WCAR picked up the country format and became WCXI "Country 11", featuring Deano Day and other former WDEE personalities. In the latter part of 1979, after less than a year, due to a highly directional signal and WCXI overtaking WDEE in the ratings, the country format was abandoned. WDEE's call sign was changed to WCZY and ran a more contemporary version of sister station WCZY-FM's highly rated easy listening music format. About a year later, the call letters changed to WLQV, meant to designate the word "love". It flipped to a Christian radio format.

In 1985, the station made one last return to playing Top 40 music as it became WCZY again. Unlike its first time as WCZY, this time it was a 100% simulcast of the FM station, which by then had changed from easy listening to Adult Top 40. With Z95.5 featuring future Radio Hall of Fame inductee Dick Purtan, much was made of Purtan's "return" to AM radio. However, the simulcast ended during the summer of 1987 when WCZY-AM was sold, returned to a religious format and changed back to the WLQV call letters.

In 1986, Gannett purchased the Detroit News. Under Federal Communications Commission guidelines against cross-ownership of newspapers and broadcasting stations within the same market, Gannett sold WLQV to former Gannett president Joe Dorton. In 1987, Mike Glinter's Satellite Radio Network purchased WLQV. Jon Yinger's Midwest Broadcasting Corporation, Too., a small chain of religious stations in the Midwest, bought WLQV in December 1993. Under the ownership of Yinger (a former Gannett GSM and GM of Satellite Radio Network), WLQV retained the Christian talk format and generated a loyal following with a niche group of listeners. The station's programming featured nationally-known evangelists and teachers such as Billy Graham, Dr. J. Vernon McGee, Charles Stanley and others, along with Detroit-area pastors and preachers. This formula stayed in place through the mid-2000s.

Yinger oversaw and completed WLQV's longstanding application for increased nighttime power. In 2003, WLQV began operating with 9 towers at night, 10,000 watts of power, ending an eighteen-year standoff with WTOP and KSTP. Both stations were also broadcasting on 1500 AM and were concerned that WLQV would interfere with their signals. By this time, Yinger's company was known as "The Christian Broadcasting System", a group of nine stations and a satellite network. "CBSL" owned WLQV until its sale to Salem. Under Yinger's ownership the station went by the name "Victory 1500", using the same brand name as then-sister stations WSNL in Flint and WLCM in Lansing.

=== Salem ownership ===
In February 2006, WLQV was sold to Salem Communications, the country's largest owner of Christian-oriented stations. The station was traded for cash and two stations in Cincinnati, Ohio. WLQV's operations were handled thereafter by a subsidiary of Salem, Caron Broadcasting. The studios were moved from suburban Livonia to downtown Detroit's Penobscot Building. In mid-September 2006 the station moved from the Penobscot Building to its new studio site in Royal Oak Township. Except for minor changes in programming and station structure, the Christian talk and teaching format continues.

WLQV is the flagship radio voice of University of Detroit Mercy men's basketball, with play-by-play provided by Dan Hasty.

For several years in the 2010s, WLQV was the Detroit-area affiliate of the Rocket Sports Radio Network, broadcasting University of Toledo football and select men's basketball games, as well as the coach's shows for both sports.

On November 18, 2016, sister station WDTK moved its FM translator, W268CN, from 92.7 FM to 101.5 FM. At the same time, 92.7 W224CC became the FM translator for WLQV.

On January 14, 2025, WLQV switched its FM translator to W268CN 101.5 FM Detroit. The former translator at 92.7 FM was switched back to a simulcast of WDTK.

== Antenna system ==
The station's transmitter is located off Dix Highway (U.S. Route 25), just south of I-75 in Lincoln Park. The station has a highly directional antenna system. There had been 12 towers arranged in 4 parallel sets of 3 towers from the time of the upgrade to 50,000 watts in the early 1960s until the demolition of the easternmost three towers. The original mid-50s Lincoln Park array featured four pairs of two towers.

A view of this array is visible in aerial images and topographic maps of the era. This site is just west of Dix Highway, near its intersection with Emmons Boulevard. In the early 1990s, the easternmost set of towers were dismantled to make room for a Super Kmart store which opened in 1994. That store closed in 2003 during Kmart's second round of bankruptcy and reopened as a Meijer in 2004.

== See also ==
- Media in Detroit
