= CIDR-FM =

Radio station in Windsor, Ontario

- Windsor, Ontario; Canada
- Broadcast area: Detroit–Windsor
- Frequency: 93.9 MHz
- Branding: 93.9 Virgin Radio

Programming
- Language: English
- Format: Contemporary hit radio

Ownership
- Owner: Bell Media; (Bell Media Radio)
- Sister stations: CHWI-DT; CIMX-FM; CKLW

History
- First air date: September 1948
- Former call signs: CKMR (1988–1991); CKEZ (1985–1986); CFXX (1984–1985); CKJY (1982–1984); CKLW-FM (1948–1982, 1986–1988, 1991–1993)
- Call sign meaning: Windsor (broadcast area) or; Detroit's River (broadcast area and former branding)

Technical information
- Licensing authority: CRTC
- Class: C1
- ERP: 79,600 watts average 100,000 watts peak
- HAAT: 188.5 meters (618 ft)
- Transmitter coordinates: 42°10′15″N 82°29′59″W

Links
- Webcast: Listen live (via iHeartRadio)
- Website: www.virginradio.ca/windsor.html

CIDR-FM (93.9 FM, 93.9 Virgin Radio) is a commercial radio station in Windsor, Ontario, Canada, targeting the Detroit–Windsor metropolitan area, with fringe reception into Toledo and Cedar Point/Sandusky in Ohio. It is owned and operated by Bell Media and airs a contemporary hit radio format. The studios and offices are located on Ouellette Avenue in Windsor.

CIDR has an average effective radiated power (ERP) of 79,600 watts, with a peak power of 100,000 watts. The transmitter is off Howard Avenue in Amherstburg.

== History ==
=== CKLW-FM ===
The station was originally launched by Western Ontario Broadcasting in 1949, as CKLW-FM. It simulcast the CBC Dominion Network programming of sister station CKLW. CKLW-AM-FM dropped CBC affiliation in 1950, with the sign-on of CBE, owned by the CBC. CKLW-AM-FM became the Metro Detroit network affiliate of the Mutual Broadcasting System.

The stations were subsequently acquired in 1956, by a consortium including the American company RKO. RKO subsequently acquired full ownership of the stations in 1963. Also that year, CKLW-FM began airing distinct programming from its AM sister station, originally broadcasting two hours of separate programming each evening from 7 to 9 pm; in 1967, this was expanded to six hours per night, from 6 pm to midnight.

=== CKJY-FM/94 Fox FM ===
In 1970, due to the CRTC's new rules on foreign ownership of Canadian media, RKO was forced to sell the stations to Baton Broadcasting. Under Baton's ownership, CKLW-FM had, by 1973, completely separated programming from its successful CHR AM sister. The FM station had a country music format with news and talk oriented toward the Windsor audience (as opposed to the AM, which chiefly targeted the American side). During the 1970s, CKLW-FM was known as FM 94 (pronounced "FM nine four"). In January 1982, the station changed its call sign to CKJY-FM, airing a MOR and jazz format.

In 1984, with CKLW's Top 40 format on a decline due to the growing popularity of rock and pop music formats on the FM dial, management tried to move the AM's Top 40 format to the FM dial with the new call sign CFXX-FM and the name 94 Fox FM. The station's staff spent months preparing for the change, commissioning new jingles, advertising extensively via billboards and television, and practicing the format until they were sure it was ready. The Canadian Radio-television and Telecommunications Commission (CRTC), however, refused to approve more than four hours of Top 40 programming a day, two in the morning and two in afternoon drive. The CRTC insisted that the station remain MOR and jazz the rest of the time, holding that a repetitive format such as Top 40 belonged on AM and that FM was for non-hit music formats such as classical music, jazz, big band and beautiful music. In 1985, Baton sold both CKLW and CFXX-FM to CUC Broadcasting, which moved the adult standards "Music of Your Life" format to CKLW and instituted an easy listening format on the FM as CKEZ-FM.

=== Big 8 on FM/More 94 ===
The call letters changed back to CKLW-FM on May 5, 1986. The station instituted an oldies format meant to recapture the sound of the original CKLW (AM), with former "Big 8" DJ Dave Shafer as program director and morning show host. The new CKLW-FM brought back the well-known Johnny Mann Singers performing jingles for the "Big 8", along with many of the legendary personalities and "20/20 News". The music rotation was based on the "Big 8" playlists from the 1960s to the 1980s plus some older 1950s and early 1960s hits that the AM had played as "golden" titles. "Ladies and gentlemen, the good times are back!" proclaimed former "Big 8" jock "Big" Jim Edwards during the station IDs. Although the overall sound was faithful to the "Big 8"'s glory days, the station's ratings remained low, as the market already had a successful oldies station in Detroit’s WOMC.

On August 29, 1988, CKLW-FM became CKMR-FM, known as More 94. The playlist was significantly reduced in its titles and the station became more tightly formatted with the top hits of the 1960s and 1970s.

=== I-94/The Legend/The River ===
After "More 94" failed to raise the station's ratings, in the fall of 1990, CKMR shifted to an urban oldies/classic soul format as I-94. Then, after only roughly four months, CKMR switched to a soft adult contemporary approach dubbed "The Motor City's Adult Music Station", which lasted roughly six months.

Then, the CKLW-FM call letters and the "Big 8"-inspired oldies format were once again restored around Labour Day of 1991, with the station branded as 93.9 The Legend. Once again, the station sounded faithful to the original CKLW, featuring stalwarts from the golden age of Detroit's Top 40 radio era such as Tom Shannon, Dave Prince, Dave Shafer and Lee Alan (host of the weekly feature Back in the '60s Again). Unfortunately, the change once again did nothing to raise the station's poor ratings.

CHUM Limited acquired the station in early 1993, and initially kept the station as an oldies outlet. In February 1994, the format was switched to an "Arrow"-style classic hits format dubbed "rock & roll oldies". It mainly featured 1970s classic rock songs with a smattering of 1960s and 1980s material. On November 11, 1994, CKLW-FM flipped to adult album alternative as 93.9 The River, Quality Rock, Real Variety. The call letters were changed to CIDR-FM. "The River" was never a ratings powerhouse, but with Ann Delisi (formerly of Detroit public-radio station WDET) at the helm and Jeff "Zippy" Crowe in the mornings, The River attracted a loyal audience. The station then tweaked the format to "smooth rock" in 1999, adding many classic rock titles to the playlist.

=== "Lite Rock" and The "River's" Return ===
On August 25, 2000, the station flipped to a soft adult contemporary format as Lite Rock 93-9 FM in an attempt to take on AC market leader WNIC. Ratings remained low, and eventually CIDR shifted its format in a hot adult contemporary direction by 2001, when WMGC-FM entered the Detroit adult contemporary competition. By the mid-2000s, the station dropped the "Lite Rock" identity from its on-air imaging and became known as simply 93.9 FM, Today's Best Music. The station competed chiefly with WDVD, along with Leamington, Ontario's CHYR for the hot AC audience. As a hot AC, CIDR was still unsuccessful.

At 3 pm on September 1, 2006, CIDR once again became 93.9 The River. About three quarters of the way through the All American Rejects' "Move Along", the song was interrupted by the sound of rushing water, and a promo for the River was broadcast. It was also announced that the station would be playing clips of over 7,000 songs commercial free, all weekend long, until Monday morning, when the songs would be "Super sized".

Logo during its second era as 93.9 The River

On September 4, at 8 am, "The River" was officially relaunched, with "Take Me to the River" by Talking Heads being the first song played. This returned the adult album alternative format back to the Detroit radio dial after public radio station WDET-FM dropped it in 2005, in favour of mainly NPR news and talk radio. CIDR was one of only a few commercial adult album alternative stations in Canada and was the only one in Ontario, with the others located in British Columbia. CIDR was Canada's first AAA-formatted station at launch.

In 2007, CIDR along with all other CHUM Radio stations across Canada, were sold to CTVglobemedia. That company became Bell Media in April 2011, following BCE's purchase of CTVglobemedia.

CIDR competed with the Canadian Broadcasting Corporation's CBC Music station CBE-FM. In 2007 and 2008, CBE-FM shifted from mostly classical music to an adult alternative format for most of the day. Another competitor in the Ann Arbor market is Cumulus Media's WQKL, which also airs a triple-A format.

=== Another 93.9 in Detroit ===
In March 2011, Martz Communications Group (through licensee Radio Power, Inc.) filed an application with the US Federal Communications Commission (FCC) to relocate the frequency of its Detroit FM translator station, W284BQ, from 104.7 to 93.9 MHz If approved, the repeater would have interfered with CIDR-FM in much of the Greater Detroit area, though the licensee contended that the transmitter would be directional, not heard over the Canadian side of the border.

However, Martz later applied to move the translator to 93.5 FM, where it would not interfere with CIDR. In November 2011, the 104.7 FM signal went silent after having broadcast a smooth jazz format (simulcasting WGPR-HD2) for several months, having been ordered off the air by the FCC due to interference with WIOT in Toledo, Ohio. Furthermore, on January 31, 2012, Martz ceased operations of its HD feeds on WGPR, and the translators, due to financial and signal difficulties.

=== Virgin Radio ===
On November 18, 2020, Bell Media announced that CIDR would adopt a new format the following day at noon; this move would be concurrent with the similar dropping of the active rock format of sister station CIMX-FM at exactly that same time. At that time, following "Somewhere Only We Know" by Keane, the station flipped to contemporary hit radio as 93.9 Virgin Radio, becoming Bell Media's 12th station under the "Virgin" branding. The first song on Virgin was "Don't Start Now" by Dua Lipa. CIDR is the second CHR station in the overall Detroit–Windsor market behind iHeartMedia's WKQI, and the first to specifically target the Canadian portion of the market, although it does provide limited competition between each other. This is also the only Virgin Radio Canada station that streams within the United States.
