= WQKE =

- Plattsburgh, New York; United States
- Broadcast area: Champlain Valley
- Frequency: 93.9 MHz
- Branding: The Quake

Programming
- Format: Freeform

Ownership
- Owner: State University of New York at Plattsburgh; (State University of New York)
- Sister stations: WARP Tele-radio, PSTV

History
- First air date: 1966
- Former call signs: WSUP, WKGO, WPLT (Pilot 94)
- Call sign meaning: "Quake"

Technical information
- Facility ID: 63128
- Class: D
- ERP: 9 watts
- HAAT: 8.0 meters (26.2 ft)
- Transmitter coordinates: 44°41′40″N 73°28′0″W

WQKE ("The Quake") was a college online-streaming radio station in Plattsburgh, New York. From 1981 until 2022, it had broadcast on terrestrial radio on 93.9 FM. The college radio station was supported by the Student Association of SUNY Plattsburgh. The station's studios were located in the Angell College Center on campus. The antenna was located on the Kehoe Administration Building, which is one of the tallest buildings in Plattsburgh. With adjustments made at the station in the fall of 2009, The Quake broadcast (and now streams) 24 hours a day, 7 days a week, offering listeners a wide variety of music including: jazz, funk, soul, indie, punk, hip-hop, blues, techno and other genres. In Spring 2024 The Quake returned, but has now been converted into an events production club.

== History ==
The station began in 1966 with the radio frequency WSUP and was carried on AM 640. In 1969, the schedule expanded to nearly 24 hours a day. In December 1971, the station changed its call sign to WKGO.

In December 1971, the station began a move to an FM frequency and became WPLT; at this point the AM channel still broadcast the station.

In 1979, the station began to air off-campus on 91.1 MHz as "The Sound of the North Country" and became a 10-watt Class D (secondary) station. In 1981, the frequency was changed to 93.9.

In 1987, the station moved from McDonough Hall to Yokum Hall where the colleges communication department was located.

In 1997, the station sold the WPLT call letters to ABC's "Planet Radio", station affiliate in Detroit and became WQKE, with that money they were able to modernize and digitize their equipment.

2001 - The initial internet broadcast on WQKE.org - marking the first time parents and friends not in the vicinity of Plattsburgh could listen to the Quake.

2002 - The first ever WQKE Starve-athon took place. Bringing community members and college organizations together for a great cause (donating at least 939 cans to the local Interfaith Food shelf).

In 2006, WQKE sponsored the King Quakers dodgeball team. Corey Collins led the team to a first round overtime loss.

In 2007, WQKE moved their studio from Yokum Hall to the Angell College Center.

In 2009, WQKE started using automation software, thus allowing the station to stay on-air 24 hours a day, even when students weren't there to oversee the station.

In 2010, Pnal performed in the quake lounge.

In the fall of 2011, WQKE restarted online streaming.

In the spring of 2012, WQKE received the Vice President of Student Affairs Community Service Award after the station participated in numerous community service endeavors over the course of the 2011–2012 academic year, headlined of their most successful Starve-a-thon can drives in the history of the event. The event also garnered the station an Outstanding Community Service Outreach Program award from the Plattsburgh State Student Association Clubs and Organization Affairs Board at their annual club awards.

In the fall of 2014, WQKE had a member go the distance in what is known now as The Randomness The Long Haul. DJ Buddy Beast aka Anthony Gallina's a student of SUNY Plattsburgh and member of WQKE. Anthony stayed on the radio 57 hours to break the original record of 27 hours.

WQKE's license was cancelled on June 2, 2022. It was one of several State University of New York-owned student radio stations whose licenses were allowed to lapse that day, without filing for renewal. WQKE continues to exist as an online streaming station.

== See also ==
- SUNY Plattsburgh
- Plattsburgh State Television
