= WUFL (FM) =

Radio station in Detroit, Michigan

- Detroit, Michigan; United States
- Broadcast area: Metro Detroit and Windsor, Ontario
- Frequency: 93.1 MHz (HD Radio)
- Branding: Family Life Radio

Programming
- Format: Contemporary Christian

Ownership
- Owner: Family Life Broadcasting; (Family Life Broadcasting System)

History
- First air date: July 9, 1947; 79 years ago
- Former call signs: WJBK-FM (1947–1969); WDEE-FM (1969–1971); WDRQ (1971–1985); WLTI (1985–1996); WDRQ (1996–2023)
- Call sign meaning: "Family Life"

Technical information
- Licensing authority: FCC
- Facility ID: 70040
- Class: B
- ERP: 26,500 watts
- HAAT: 204 meters (669 ft)
- Transmitter coordinates: 42°28′16″N 83°12′3″W

Links
- Public license information: Public file; LMS
- Webcast: Listen Live
- Website: myflr.org

WUFL (93.1 MHz) is an FM radio station licensed to Detroit, Michigan. Owned by Family Life Broadcasting, it broadcasts a Contemporary Christian music radio format, with some Christian talk and teaching programs airing at certain times of the day. The transmitter is located at the intersection of 10 Mile and Greenfield Road in suburban Oak Park.

== History ==
=== Top 40 (1947–1964) ===
The station, originally owned by Storer Broadcasting, first signed on as WJBK-FM in the summer of 1947. The station initially broadcast only six hours per day but implemented 24-hour operations in October 1947. From 1947 to 1966, WJBK-FM programming was strict 100% duplication of the co-owned AM station WJBK, and the FM side continued to simulcast through several programming changes. WJBK was Detroit's first top 40 station, playing hit music from 1956 to 1964.

=== Easy listening (1964–1969) ===
After 1964, WJBK-FM fully and then partially simulcast the AM's new easy listening and then MOR format, and its brief return to Top 40 in 1969. Starting in 1966, WJBK-FM began to introduce separate stereo programming for about 50% of the broadcast day, due to new FCC rules which restricted AM/FM simulcasting.

=== Country (1969–1971) ===
In late 1969, WJBK-AM-FM became WDEE AM & FM (The Big D) and implemented a country format with a Top 40-style presentation. The AM side quickly returned to high ratings; however, WDEE-FM remained virtually invisible. According to a Billboard magazine article in February 1970, WDEE-FM was on the air from 6 am to midnight, duplicating the AM programming from 5 pm to midnight and during the day airing separate stereo country programming syndicated by Bellingham, WA-based International Good Music.

=== Talk (1971-197?) ===
In 1971, WDEE-FM was sold to Bartell Media Corporation, changed its call sign to WDRQ, and became Detroit's first FM talk radio station. As a stunt to draw attention to the new station and about-to-be launched format, the station ran a weekend-long documentary, The History of Detroit Radio, covering the then-current and past scene of Detroit radio (with special emphasis given to rock and roll stations) put together by longtime radio enthusiast and former Oakland Press radio columnist Arthur R. Vuolo, Jr.

=== Top 40 (197?-1979) ===
Ultimately, the news/talk format proved to be unsuccessful and WDRQ switched to Top 40 as The Super Q. Bartell at the time owned such legendary AM Top 40 stations as KCBQ in San Diego and WOKY in Milwaukee. Like those stations, WDRQ used consultant Buzz Bennett's fast-paced "Q" format. Like its rival, CKLW The Big 8, WDRQ featured a tight playlist which leaned toward R&B and soul records, but unlike The Big 8, WDRQ was not bound by Canadian content regulations requiring them to play a certain percentage of Canadian music in their rotation, which enabled them to play only the top hits and enabled them to make strong ratings inroads against CKLW. By 1977, WDRQ was the number one Top 40 station in Detroit.

WDRQ also became intimately involved in Detroit. It organized its listeners to gather on a Saturday and clean up Detroit parks, and gave free concerts at Belle Isle Park, including one with Detroiter Bob Seger. PD Jerry Clifton kept the excitement level much higher at WDRQ than other stations by having some sort of festival each weekend and mercilessly promoted the upcoming weekend promotion during the week.

CKLW and WDRQ also became personal rivals. CKLW put up a billboard at the cost of several thousand dollars bragging about their latest dominant Arbitron ratings on a major street that all jocks, newsmen and office personnel of WDRQ would see as they pulled into the parking lot of WDRQ. WDRQ did a "black bag" visit to CKLW on a hot Sunday when the jock and board operator were the only one at the station, but because of the hot day, the CKLW jock propped the door open for a breeze, allowing the WDRQ staff to browse around.

=== Disco (1979–1980) ===
Then, on January 24, 1979, WDRQ made a format shift to disco as "Disco 93", inspired by the success of the all-disco format at WKTU in New York City. The move to disco was not received well in Detroit, and WDRQ tumbled out of Arbitron's top 20 ratings within a few months.

=== Top 40 (1980–1982) ===
WDRQ returned to a mainstream Top 40 format at the beginning of 1980 and made a brief return to the top 10 that spring, but the big story in Detroit radio that year was the meteoric rise of album-rocker WLLZ. WDRQ's ratings once again began to drop, reaching an all-time low of a 1.4 share in the Winter 1982 Arbitron ratings.

=== Urban (1982–1985) ===
In response to this, WDRQ shifted its format to urban contemporary in March 1982, and immediately saw the format change pay off, climbing to a 3.0 share in the Spring 1982 ratings report, and then to a 6.6 in Summer 1982. "Continuous Music—93FM WDRQ" was a success, and the opening of Beverly Hills Cop features an advertisement for this version of WDRQ on a city bus. Bartell sold the station to Amaturo Broadcasting in the early 1980s, who later sold it to Keymarket Communications. The original incarnation of Viacom later purchased the station in a trade with Keymarket for a station that Viacom owned in Memphis in the mid-1980s that Keymarket wanted.

=== Adult contemporary (1985–1996) ===
In April 1985, owner Amaturo Radio Group dropped the urban format of WDRQ, flipping the station to soft adult contemporary and changing the call sign to WLTI (initially known as W-Lite, later 93.1 Lite FM). The station initially aired a syndicated format from Transtar called Format 41 (so named because it consisted of songs meant to appeal to female listeners in their early 40s), described by Amaturo president Monte Lang in an April 20, 1985 Billboard article as "targeted at listeners who prefer Barbra Streisand and Neil Diamond and leaning toward easy listening." Despite the success Amaturo had had with Format 41 with its own WJQY in the Fort Lauderdale-Miami market, the Detroit market was already crowded with adult contemporary stations and WLTI failed to attract an audience until the station added local personalities around 1987. DJs such as the morning drive team of Eddie Rogers and Pat Holiday (both veterans of CKLW) – whose show featured comedic "celebrity" drop-ins by the spoofed likes of Rodney Dangerfield, Clint Eastwood and Eddie Murphy, as well as original characters like Mr. Action - enabled the station to hold its own in competition against the other AC stations in the market, including WNIC. Through the early 1990s, the station's music became more contemporary, and the "easy listening" artists were gradually phased out.

=== Rhythmic (1996–1999) ===
WDRQ logo from 2000 to 2005

On August 9, 1996, WDRQ returned as a Rhythmic adult contemporary station. The first song on the relaunched "DRQ" was "Brick House" by The Commodores. Viacom sold the station to ABC Radio during this time. Initially, the station called itself "93-1 The New DRQ: Detroit's Station For Women". The station was initially jockless, with only an announcer used for on-air bumper promos. The station chiefly played a random mix of programmed dance, disco and pop music from the late 1970s through the early 1990s, with some new music factored in sporadically. More current dance-oriented Top 40 music was added to the playlist in the Fall, when Program Director Lisa Rodman and Music Director Jay Towers took over programming operations. By late 1996, the station had added a full lineup of personalities, including Marc Mitchell, Sharon Santoni and Trixie DeLuxxe in mornings, Jay Towers in middays, Lisa Lisa Orlando in afternoons, Mark "JoJo" Allen on evenings, and Michael Allen on overnights.

By January 1997, a lite mix of pop-friendly R&B and hip-hop music was also adopted to further cement the station's mainstream hook. With this being the first time a Top 40/dance music station had been on Detroit radio since the reformatting of WHYT two years earlier, WDRQ immediately attracted a large listening audience upon its re-launch. Subsequently, the station quickly abandoned the female-skewing format and promoted itself as a dance music station.

=== Top 40 (1999–2005) ===
By April 1999, the station had evolved into more of a mainstream Top 40 format and was eating away at its adult-leaning Top 40 competitor WKQI. The lineup became Jay Towers in the morning, Jamie Reese and Dave Fuller middays, Lisa Lisa in the afternoon, Tic Tak (Mark Allen) at night, and Eric Chase on overnights. By the final quarter of 2001, both WDRQ and WKQI were leaning very heavily toward Rhythmic CHR. For a time, WDRQ consistently defeated WKQI in the ratings, but after Clear Channel re-launched WKQI as Channel 9-5-5 in February 2002, WKQI retook the lead over WDRQ, garnering both larger ratings and revenue. As WKQI became increasingly rhythmic, WDRQ backed away somewhat from its own rhythmic lean, adding more Adult Top 40 songs and 1990s gold from the likes of Alanis Morissette and Third Eye Blind.

=== Adult hits (2005–2013) ===
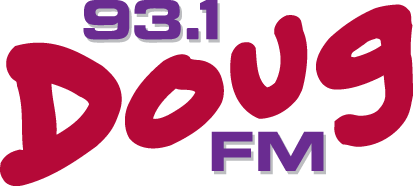
93.1 Doug FM logo 2005–2013

At 1 p.m. on April 1, 2005, after playing "She Will Be Loved" by Maroon 5, WDRQ abruptly changed formats to adult hits, branded as "93.1 Doug FM"; the first song on "Doug" was "Good Times Roll" by The Cars. Many DRQ listeners were both confused and disgruntled over the format change.

ABC sold its non-Radio Disney and ESPN Radio stations, including WDRQ, to Citadel Broadcasting in 2007. Citadel merged with Cumulus Media on September 16, 2011.

=== Country (2013–2023) ===
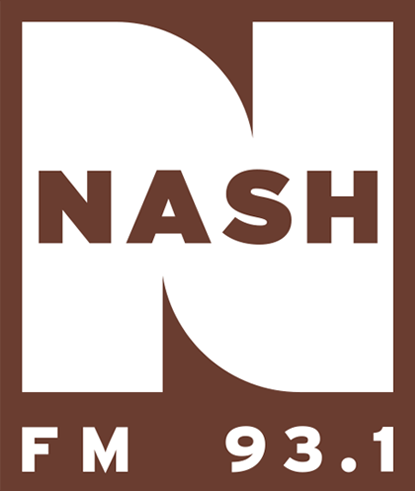
Nash-FM 93.1 logo 2013–2020

By November 2013, WDRQ had languished, ranking 18th in Nielsen Audio ratings for the Detroit market with a 2.5 share. On December 13, 2013 at 9:31 a.m., after playing "Someday" by Sugar Ray, WDRQ flipped to country music as Nash FM 93.1, soft launching with Christmas music by country artists for the holiday season before launching the format outright at 9:31 a.m. on January 2, 2014; the first "official" song under the format was "Radio" by Darius Rucker. The new format would compete primarily with CBS Radio's market-leading WYCD.

On February 18, 2020, WDRQ rebranded as New Country 93.1. The rebranding came alongside changes to its on-air lineup, including afternoon host Bill "Broadway" Bert moving to mornings and joined by former WKQI personality Kristina "Krissy" Williamson (replacing the syndicated Ty Bentli Show).

=== Sale to Family Life Radio ===
On June 12, 2023, radio news outlet RadioInsight reported that Cumulus Media was on the verge of selling WDRQ to a Christian-based ownership group. Later that day, the site officially confirmed Cumulus would sell WDRQ to Family Life Broadcasting, which had been founded in nearby Mason, for $10 million. The sale marked the return of their non-commercial Family Life Radio network to the area following the company's sale of previous outlet WUFL (1030 AM) the previous November. With the move, Cumulus Detroit director of FM programming David Corey, who had oversaw WDRQ and WDVD, would depart the company.

On July 31, 2023, Family Life Radio closed on the sale and launched its programming on the station at midnight that night; a call sign change to WUFL took effect on August 10. The following day, Cumulus moved the new country format to WDVD's HD3 channel rebranded as "New Country Detroit" where it remained until February 19, 2024.

=== HD Radio ===
When WDRQ-HD2 first went on the air in January 2006, it was originally a simulcast of AM talk station WJR. In 2007, the HD2 channel began broadcasting a Rhythmic/Dance format as "Detroit's Party Station", featuring WDRQ's presentation from the mid-1990s. On January 29, 2009, WDRQ's HD2 channel changed to Doug's Wedding Reception, a Doug FM spin-off with an emphasis on party music.

In July 2011, Doug's Wedding Reception switched to a gold-based rhythmic AC format featuring rhythmic oldies and dance music from the 1970s, 1980s and 1990s. In August 2012, the channel flipped to a rhythmic classic hits format inspired by WDRQ's CHR era as 93-1 DRQ, focusing primarily on pop hits spanning from 1996 to 2005. In January 2014, the station shifted to a more rhythmic hot AC format, dropping most of the older dance tracks, but still featuring music of the original DRQ from 1996 to 2005, along with some newer selections as well.

On August 15, 2014, WDRQ-HD2 dropped its rhythmic format in favor of Nash Icon — a complement to the main country format with an emphasis on artists popular from the 1980s through the early 2000s. After the switch to Family Life radio, the HD radio channels were turned off.

== See also ==
- Media in Detroit
