= WDVD =

- Detroit, Michigan; United States
- Broadcast area: Metro Detroit
- Frequency: 96.3 MHz (HD Radio)
- Branding: 96.3 WDVD

Programming
- Format: Hot adult contemporary
- Subchannels: HD2: Simulcast of WJR (news/talk)
- Affiliations: Westwood One

Ownership
- Owner: Cumulus Media; (Radio License Holdings LLC)
- Sister stations: WJR

History
- First air date: June 1, 1948
- Former call signs: WJR-FM (1948–1982); WHYT (1982–1997); WPLT (1997–2001)
- Call sign meaning: The slogans of "Detroit's Best Variety" or "Detroit's Variety Destination", along with alliterative frequency calls

Technical information
- Licensing authority: FCC
- Facility ID: 8631
- Class: B
- ERP: 20,000 watts
- HAAT: 240 meters (790 ft)
- Transmitter coordinates: 42°27′13.1″N 83°9′49.7″W

Links
- Public license information: Public file; LMS
- Webcast: Listen live
- Website: www.963wdvd.com

WDVD (96.3 FM) is a hot adult contemporary radio station in Detroit, Michigan. Owned and operated by Cumulus Media, WDVD's studios and offices are located in the Fisher Building in Detroit's New Center district near downtown, while its transmitter is located in Royal Oak Township at 8 Mile Road and Wyoming Avenue.

WDVD broadcasts with an effective radiated power of 20,000 watts from an antenna that is 787 feet in height, and transmits its signal from the same tower from which five other Detroit FM radio stations broadcast. WDVD is licensed for HD Radio operations.

== History ==
=== AM simulcast (1948–1966) ===
On June 1, 1948, the station signed on as WJR-FM, simulcasting WJR (760 AM), Detroit's CBS Radio Network affiliate.

=== Beautiful music (1966–1969) ===
In 1966 WJR-FM separated programming from WJR (AM) and began airing "The Young Sound", a beautiful music format featuring instrumental covers of contemporary hits which was used on many CBS-affiliated FM stations.

=== Rock (1969–1971) ===
In 1969, the station adopted the "Solid Gold Rock and Roll" automated format from Drake-Chenault, a mix of soft rock, current Easy Listening (adult contemporary) chart hits, and rock and roll oldies, and began to brand itself as "California Radio".

=== Beautiful music (1971–1982) ===
After almost three years, the station reverted to beautiful music, with which it was quite successful for a time. Competitors at this time were WLDM-FM (now WKQI), WWJ-FM (now WXYT-FM), and WKNR-FM (later WNIC-FM).

=== Top 40 (1982–1986) ===
In June 1982, Billboard Magazine reported that WJR-FM's owner, Capital Cities Communications, had hired consultant Mike Joseph to implement his widely successful "Hot Hits" format on WJR-FM by the fall of that year, taking note of the success the format was having in Philadelphia (WCAU-FM) and in Chicago (WBBM-FM). In July 1982, WJR-FM applied to the Federal Communications Commission (FCC) for a call sign change to WHYT. The call sign change was approved on August 16, 1982; as such, despite efforts by the airstaff to prove otherwise, since the change occurred while the old format was still running (claiming the new call letters stood for the "height" their music went), the transition had already begun.

On September 15, 1982, at 5 p.m., WHYT converted to a new format after one last spin of "Fly Me to the Moon" by Frank Sinatra, followed by the first song of the new format, "You Dropped a Bomb on Me" by The Gap Band. "Hot Hits" was a fast-moving, jingle-intensive format that featured a tight rotation of 50 current hits (no recurrent hits or oldies, unless they happened to be featured on currently charting albums).

The station used the on-air names 96 Now (the same slogan used by WBBM-FM, which still operates on the same frequency in Chicago to this day) and 96 WHYT. The "Hot Hits" format in Detroit was a moderate ratings success, but did not approach the popularity that WCAU or WBBM-FM were enjoying with Hot Hits, probably due in part to heavy competition from Detroit's urban contemporary and album rock stations. In response, WHYT's CHR format went through several metamorphoses in the next few years, dropping the Mike Joseph format (though they continued to use the slogan "Hot Hits" on the air through 1986) and adopting several different on-air monikers, including WHYT 96 Hit FM, and HitRadio 96 WHYT. One of the noteworthy WHYT personalities during this time was Joey Reynolds, who had last worked in Detroit radio at WXYZ-AM eighteen years earlier.

=== Rhythmic top 40 (1986–1992) ===
In 1986, shortly after Capital Cities merged with ABC, the station retooled itself as Power 96. Under programmer Rick Gillette, the station added more dance music and urban contemporary product to its CHR playlist, and listenership increased, leading the station to be a regular top 10 ratings finisher through the end of the decade. In 1989, the station rebranded as simply 96.3 FM, taking on even more of a rhythmic contemporary lean. For much of the 1980s, WHYT was Detroit's local affiliate for Casey Kasem's (and then Shadoe Stevens') "American Top 40" and the first couple of years of Scott Shannon's "Rockin' America Top 30 Countdown". WHYT ended its run with "Rockin' America" in 1986 when its affiliation moved to WDFX.

WHYT's major competitors from the mid-1980s through the early 1990s were Z95.5 and 99.5 The Fox, as well as then-Churban powerhouse WJLB. The station's peak of popularity came during its days as both Power 96 and then 96.3 FM from roughly 1986 to 1991, when the station moved its music mix toward rhythmic CHR (while not totally abandoning mainstream pop and rock), frequently racked up top five Arbitron ratings 12+, and was one of the top stations in the 12-24 age demographics (often neck-and-neck with WJLB, with Z95.5 coming in a distant third despite often beating WHYT 12+). Michael J. Foxx (not to be confused with actor Michael J. Fox), Sonny Joe Harris, Beau “The Jammer" Daniels, Dave Fogel, Lisa Lisa "The Party Princess" Orlando (not to be confused with the musical artist Lisa Lisa of Lisa Lisa & Cult Jam), Michael Waite and the Morning Zoo were all popular DJ's at WHYT. In 1991, however, the debut of 89X, as well as Foxx's departure, took substantial market share away from WHYT as teens and young adults flocked to the "cutting edge" modern rock format of 89X.

=== Rhythmic (1992–1994) ===
In 1992, the station delved even farther into rhythmic CHR territory, becoming known as "96.3 Jamz". WHYT eliminated most of the mainstream pop and rock from its playlist and began to focus almost exclusively on hip hop, R&B and dance hits as well as some dance remixes of mainstream hits.

=== Alternative rock (1994–1997) ===
During Memorial Day weekend in 1994 came a formatic shift at WHYT, as the station modified its Rhythmic CHR format into a sound it tagged Planet Jams, evolving into a hybrid of hip hop and alternative rock while dropping all R&B product. This format, known in radio trades as "Channel X" (also implemented at KUBE in Seattle among other stations), was described by some as a radio version of MTV. Alternative bands such as Soundgarden, Nine Inch Nails, and Pearl Jam were played alongside Coolio, Snoop Dogg, and Da Brat, and the station also continued to sprinkle in some dance hits from the likes of Real McCoy, Madonna, Ace of Base, and 2 Unlimited. Within a few months, the station would drop all hip hop and dance songs as WHYT, now known as The Planet 96.3, became a more straightforward alternative station.

In reference to the format shift, program director Rick Gillette, who had guided WHYT to high ratings during its "Power 96" and "96.3FM" days in the late 1980s, claimed that the station was merely responding to the popularity of the "hot" music of the time, which happened to be Alternative. In addition to Pearl Jam, Alice in Chains, Soundgarden, and the other popular rock bands of the day, the Planet played a number of local Detroit acts that never achieved major national stardom, such as the Suicide Machines and Charm Farm, as well as some non-mainstream dance and ambient artists such as Vanessa Daou.

After completing a deal with a college radio station in Plattsburgh, New York, the station's calls were switched to WPLT to match the "Planet" moniker on June 30, 1997. (The WHYT calls are now used at a contemporary Christian music station near Lapeer, Michigan.)

=== Modern AC (1997–1999) ===
With the call letter change, however, the station tweaked its format to more of a Modern Adult Contemporary sound to distinguish it more from competing alternative-rock station CIMX (and, later in 1997, WXDG). The Planet dropped White Zombie, The Offspring and other harder-edged artists from its playlist and focused more on alternative pop-rock acts such as Jewel, Sheryl Crow, and Barenaked Ladies. The Planet also emphasized Classic Alternative music heavily, with the hour-long "Flashback Lunch" middays at noon; "Saturday Night Flashbacks", with dance and extended versions of classic alternative and '80s songs, broadcast live from the nightclub Clutch Cargo's in suburban Pontiac; and holiday-weekend countdowns of "The Coolest Flashbacks of All Time". During this time, the station identified itself as Modern Hits of the 80s and 90s. A popular feature on WPLT was Big Sonic Heaven, a Sunday-night program of ambient, trance, chill and non-mainstream dance music hosted by DJ Darren Revell.

=== Classic alternative (1999–2001) ===
The Planet made some ratings headway with the Modern AC format, but was never a major player in the market. On September 6, 1999, at 4:30 p.m., after finishing their Labor Day weekend "Flashback 500" countdown (with "In Your Eyes" by Peter Gabriel being the No. 1 song), the station began a 3-hour stunt of a loop of "It's the End of the World as We Know It (And I Feel Fine)" by R.E.M. At 7:30 p.m., WPLT relaunched as "Alternative Classics", an attempt to convert the station's popular 1980s "Flashback" shows into a full-time format by combining 1980s new wave and punk with more recent (but non-current) 1990s grunge/alternative, while keeping the "Planet" moniker. The first song on the relaunched "Planet" was "Plush" by Stone Temple Pilots. Core artists of "Alternative Classics" included U2, Depeche Mode, The Cure, The Go-Go's, Peter Gabriel, Erasure, and Echo & the Bunnymen. The change failed to raise ratings, and within a year, WPLT had begun to re-add current music into its rotation (such as "Smooth" by Santana and Rob Thomas) under the guise of "Future Alternative Classics".

=== Hot adult contemporary (2001–present) ===
In response to continued low ratings, the station dropped its "Planet" moniker in early 2001, changed its calls to WDVD on March 14, and gradually shifted its playlist towards a more mainstream hot adult contemporary direction, though still heavy on alternative rock. The shift was completed on June 29, when the station adopted the new "96.3 DVD" moniker and the "Today's Best Variety" slogan. The "Flashback" programs and "Big Sonic Heaven" were cancelled shortly afterward. (The WPLT calls have since been picked up by a country station in Spooner, Wisconsin.)

After the transition to Hot AC and the WDVD calls, the station continued to feature a heavy alternative-rock base for several years, while playing "hair bands" such as Poison and Aerosmith and pop artists like Kelly Clarkson and Christina Aguilera, and remained in the lower echelons of the Detroit ratings. By 2006, however, this began to change as WDVD freshened its presentation and began to evolve into more of an Adult Top 40 station, dropping most 1980s titles from its playlist, adding jingles, and branded itself with the new slogan Today's Best Hits Without the Rap (and taking shots at longtime rival station WKQI for playing too much hip hop). Generally, though, as per its slogan, the station avoids hip hop music except for those who cross over to the Hot AC charts. Songs by Hot AC artists with hip hop guest stars, such as "California Gurls" by Katy Perry and Snoop Dogg, typically have the rap breaks edited out. The slogan has been reduced to "Today's Best Hits" as the station was gradually more accepting to songs with limited rap by the end of the 2010s.

In February 2006, WDVD, along with its sister stations, WJR and WDRQ, were included in the sale of ABC Radio to Citadel Broadcasting. The sale was completed on June 12, 2007. According to the Citadel page, Citadel considered WDVD an adult-leaning Top 40 station without rap. After several years in the ratings doldrums, the station subsequently saw its share of the Detroit market increase, as they added more pop music from artists such as Lady Gaga, Jennifer Lopez, and Britney Spears to their playlist to compete with both Channel 9-5-5 and 98-7 Amp Radio, while rotations of 1980s and 1990s titles were decreased. By June 2012, the station had moved even closer to Adult Top 40 by adding pop-friendly hip hop artists such as Nicki Minaj, LMFAO, and Flo Rida into rotation.

In late 2014, the station tweaked its playlist again, removing many of the more rhythmic-oriented tracks from rotation and re-adding many 1980s and 1990s hits. As a result, Cumulus Media moved WDVD from Mediabase's Hot AC panel to the Mainstream AC panel, giving Detroit two Mainstream AC reporter stations (along with WNIC), although the station remained closer to Hot AC musically. The station has since returned to the Hot AC panel but continues to play more 1980s music than is the norm for contemporary Hot AC. In addition, the station's slogan of "Today's Best Hits" has changed as of May 2017 to "Today's Best Music".

The station's morning show hosts, Allyson Martinek and Blaine Fowler, were featured on the syndicated television program Dish Nation until November 2012.

On July 28, 2015, Allyson Martinek was let go from the station, with Blaine Fowler remaining in mornings. Martinek then later joined WNIC in November 2016, exactly one year and four months after she was let go from the station.

==== Competition ====
In addition to its CHR competition, beginning in August 2011, WDVD gained a direct competitor in the Hot AC format as longtime Mainstream AC station WNIC, rebranded as "Fresh 100.3" moved to a Hot AC playlist. WNIC returned to its previous AC format a little over a year later and has also since dropped the "Fresh" name. On the Canadian side of the border, WDVD also directly competes with CHYR-FM for listeners in Windsor and Essex County, Ontario.

== HD radio ==
In 2007, WDVD revived "Planet 96.3" and the "Alternative Classics" format as an offering on its secondary HD Radio channel. This was dropped and replaced by "Top 20 New Hits", a format focusing on new Adult CHR releases not yet played on the main station. In August 2012, WDVD revived the "Planet 96.3" name and Modern AC/Classic Alternative format, playing classic alternative songs from the '70s, '80s and '90s, songs that were played on the original Planet 96.3 as currents in the late 1990s, and a few more recent titles.

In the spring of 2015, WDVD HD2 flipped formats again, this time to a simulcast of news/talk sister station WJR. On August 2, 2023, Cumulus moved the new country format (rebranded as "New Country Detroit") which had been on its sister station 93.1 FM WDRQ (now WUFL) to WDVD's HD3 channel following WDRQ's sale and format change to Family Life Radio. The HD-3 signal has since been shut off.

== See also ==
- Media in Detroit
