= WOPR (Michigan) =

High school radio station in Oak Park, Michigan (1974–1985)

Oak Park, Michigan; United States
- Frequency: 90.3 MHz

Ownership
- Owner: Oak Park High School

History
- First air date: 1974; 51 years ago
- Last air date: 1985; 40 years ago

Technical information
- ERP: 10 watts
- Transmitter coordinates: 42°27′54″N 83°11′2″W

WOPR (90.3 FM) was a high school radio station on the campus of Oak Park High School in Oak Park, Michigan, United States. It operated from 1974 to 1985.

== History ==
The Board of Education of the Oak Park School District applied on May 18, 1972, for a construction permit to build a new 10-watt noncommercial radio station at the school. The Federal Communications Commission granted the school district a construction permit on March 6, 1973, originally bearing the call sign WQOW. The high school filed for the license on May 31, 1974, after completing construction, and the WOPR call letters were secured before broadcasts began in the 1974–1975 school year, primarily playing freeform music. In 1975, the format was revised to include more extensive coverage of Oak Park High School sporting events, including three live home football games; it also aired blocks of easy listening and top 40 music, news prepared by students, and school board meetings.

In 1982, WOPR closed because of a lack of funding, but a grant from local cable company Continental Cablevision gave the station $15,000 in new equipment and led to its reopening in 1983. The equipment was a condition of that company gaining the contract to build a cable system in Oak Park. During this time, Perry Berkley, a local DJ who was an Oak Park alumnus and had worked at WOPR in the 1970s, served as faculty advisor. Instead of an all-rock format, as it had in the years leading up to the revamp, the station reverted to blocks of different genres of music, going as far as to force DJs to change the music they played every two weeks. By its last year, 1985, there were 60 involved students, up from 12 before the revamp.

Oak Park High School was forced to convert WOPR from a class into a club in 1985 due to budget cuts. As a result, there was no longer money for a faculty advisor, and the station was forced off the air. Despite this, the station was not deleted from FCC records until 2001, 16 years after it ceased broadcasting, when the school failed to respond to an inquiry from the commission as to its operating status.
