= George Washington Carver School District =

Former school district in Michigan, United States

Coordinates: 42°26′59″N 83°09′55″W

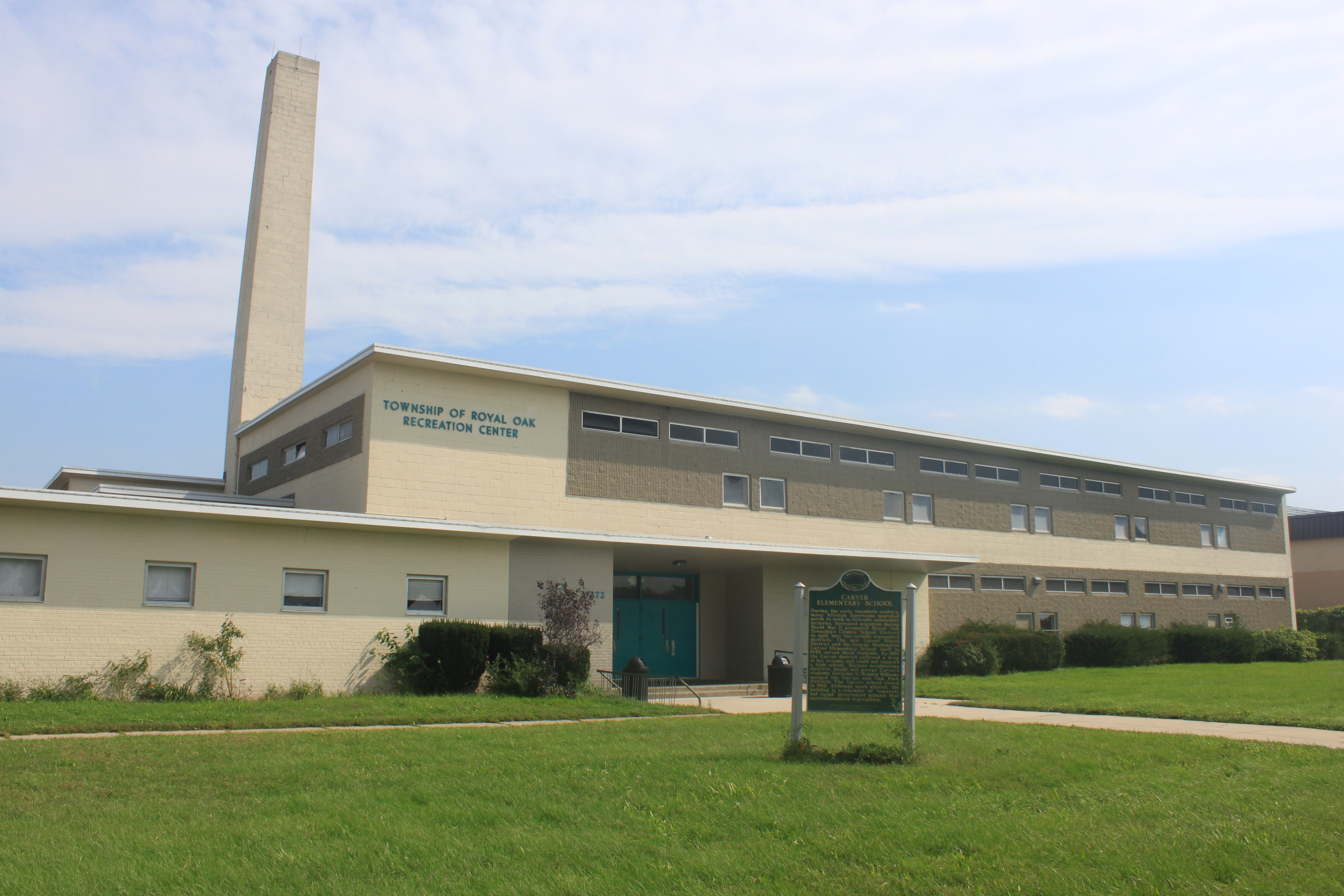
The former George Washington Carver Elementary School, now the Township of Royal Oak Recreation Center

George Washington Carver School District was a majority-Black school district in Royal Oak Township, Michigan.

In early 1945, the Clinton School District consisted of two small schools, Clinton in the northern part of the district and Wineman in the southern. In February 1945, the federal government opened Oakdale Gardens there, an African-American housing project on Eight Mile Road for World War II production workers. In response to the rising Black population, whites in the district circulated a petition to the Oakland County board of education to separate the district into two—one serving Blacks in the southern, Oakdale Gardens area and one serving whites in the northern part of the district.

In a public meeting, Black residents argued against the split and charged racism, but according to a newspaper report, they ultimately acquiesced. The division was then approved by voters in the district. The name of the new district was Royal Oak township primary school district No. 1, and was ultimately changed to the George Washington Carver School District. The new district immediately set to replacing Wineman School with a new 33-room school, which opened in fall 1945.

Most of the structures in the housing project were intended to be temporary, and as they were replaced with single-family homes, the neighborhood remained a Black enclave. Although the district did not include its own high school, it had an arrangement to pay Detroit Public Schools to teach its students at Northern High School. A new addition to the school was completed in 1952.

Throughout the 1950s, school leadership was in turmoil. The district gained a reputation for corruption, with many of its leaders being accused of financial malfeasance.

In 1953, three school board members were charged with defrauding a contractor who had painted the school. Several outspoken teachers were disciplined, leading to a protest by six adults who tried to stop students from entering the school. During the protest the school's phone lines were cut and windows smashed. The board members were found not guilty.

Another protest occurred in October 1954, when a citizens group alleged that the July 1954 school board election was fraudulent. As citizens picketed outside, teachers, who were also upset about stagnant wages, carried out a wildcat strike. After the Oakland County Circuit Court demanded a recount of the votes, it was found that the count had indeed been wrong, and one of the ousted board members was reinstated. A few weeks later, disagreement between factions on the school board over which member of the board would be the secretary resulted in pandemonium during a public meeting, in which two clergymen got into a fist fight and police had to restore order.

Without a board secretary, the state would not allow the district to issue paychecks. As teachers read in the library, parents blocked students from entering the building. To prevent violence, the Oakland County Prosecutor temporarily closed the school until there could be a resolution. This left Carver's 2,200 students locked out of school for three days. The crisis came to an end when the prosecutor threatened charges. The school board chose a secretary, the teachers received back pay, and the school was reopened on Monday, November 22, 1954.

There were allegations that bribes were given by candidates to attain teaching positions, and that some staff were paid despite not working. In 1955, several board members were accused of misusing school funds, leading to a recall election. Also that year, the school board fired the principal of Carver School, Adelaide Long, "on the ground that she had colluded with others to assist Julius Mallard to receive a regular contract at said school." She was reinstated to her job by the State Tenure Commission and ultimately, the Michigan Supreme Court.

Despite apparent financial mismanagement of the district, Michigan's public school funding system at the time ensured high-poverty districts had much less funding revenue for schools anyway. Because revenue from property taxes could not fund the district, it operated in a perpetual deficit. It borrowed money every year to pay the loans and interest from previous years.

In 1959, Detroit Public Schools (DPS) stopped accepting high school students from Carver because Carver owed DPS $125,053.67 (about $1.5 million in 2025 dollars) in tuition and because DPS's own schools became overcrowded. Ferndale High School and Oak Park High School also would not take the students, creating a crisis for the district. At the time, 24 ninth grade students resided in the Carver district.

In 1960, Governor of Michigan G. Mennen Williams consolidated the Carver School District, along with its school, into the Oak Park School District, thus guaranteeing its students a high school education. As part of the Oak Park School District, the school was renovated in 1970. Construction involved dividing the building in two by tearing down classrooms in the middle and leaving the northern section vacant. The district gave the northern section to the township, and in 1972 the township received funding from the Michigan Department of Natural Resources to turn the building into a recreation center.

In January 1983, the Oak Park District school board voted to close Carver Elementary. For many years, it was owned by Kingswood Hospital. It then became a charter school called Academy of Oak Park, operating between 2000 and 2010.

A historic marker was placed at the building in 1997.
