= Bethany Ball =

American fiction writer

- Born: Detroit, Michigan, U.S.
- Education: Ferndale High School; Eastern Michigan University; Sarah Lawrence College (MFA)
- Occupations: Novelist; short story writer
- Writing career
- Genre: Fiction
- Website: thebethanyball.com

Bethany Ball is an American novelist and short story writer. She is the author of What to Do About the Solomons and The Pessimists, both published by Grove Atlantic.

== Biography ==
Bethany Ball was born in Detroit, Michigan and attended Grant Elementary School in Royal Oak Township. She attended Ferndale High School and graduated from Eastern Michigan University. Her father, Robert S. Ball, Jr was a reporter for the Royal Oak Daily Tribune and her grandfather was the Washington correspondent for The Detroit News.

She has lived in Santa Fe, New Jersey, Miami, and Israel, and is currently based in New York with her family. Upon moving to New York City, she worked as an editorial assistant in book publishing for a very low wage, an experience she wrote about in Electric Literature. She received a Master of Fine Arts from Sarah Lawrence College in 2013.

== Writing ==
Ball's debut novel, What to Do About the Solomons, was published by Grove Atlantic in 2017 and was a finalist for both the Center for Fiction First Novel Prize and the National Jewish Book Award's Goldberg Prize. Writing about the novel for The New York Times, Alana Newhouse says, "On its face, this book is a wry, dark multigenerational tale about the Israeli and American branches of an extended family. Like any Jewish story worth the salt that Lot's wife became, it's admirably and quite beautifully rooted in 20th-century history — and yet, at the same time, it largely steers clear of the politics that, from one angle or another, drag down so many contemporary novels."

Author Judy Blume called the book "funny, sexy, and smart".

Her second novel, The Pessimists, was published by Grove in 2021. In a review for The New York Times, Molly Young describes the novel as "a delectably numbed-out tale of three couples in a wealthy Connecticut suburb who face the possible destruction of their marriages, bodies, minds and the earth." In her review of the novel for The Washington Post, Bethanne Patrick notes, "We're often told to keep our friends close and our enemies closer. Ball reminds us that sometimes we mistake one for the other, and that one of the most important parts of parenting is helping children discern the difference."

Ball's fiction and essays have appeared in publications such as Zyzzyva, The Sewanee Review, The Common, Electric Literature, and American Literary Review

== Awards ==
- Finalist, Center for Fiction First Novel Prize (2017)
- Finalist, National Jewish Book Award's Goldberg Prize, Jewish Book Council (2017)

== Publications ==
- The Pessimists (2021) ISBN 978-0802158888
- What to Do About the Solomons (2017) ISBN 978-0802124579
