= Volodymyr Shamenko =

Volodymyr Shamenko or Vladimir Shmondenko or Владимир Шмонденко, may refer to:

- Volodymyr Shamenko (gymnast) (born 1972), Olympic gymnast
- Vladimir Shmondenko (weightlifter) (born 1999), weightlifter athlete and social media video producer
