= Ben Forta =

American software engineer

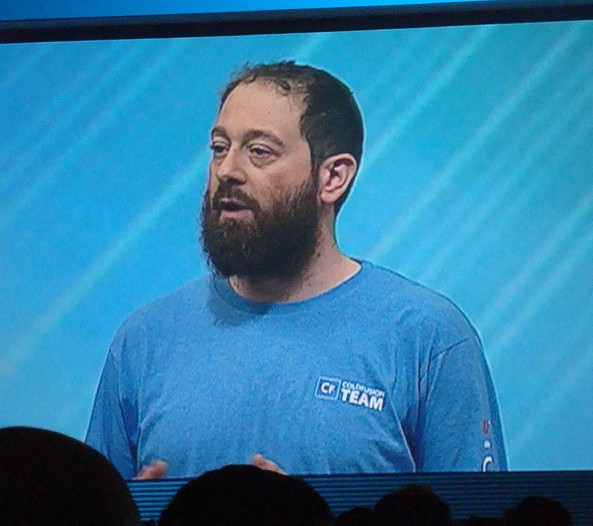
- Ben Forta as seen at Adobe MAX 2007 delivering the Keynote
- Born: London
- Citizenship: American
- Occupations: Senior Director of Education Initiatives & Author
- Employer: Adobe Systems
- Known for: Prolific author and speaker on EdTech
- Spouse: Marcy
- Children: 7
- Website: Forta.com

Ben Forta is Adobe Systems Inc's Senior Director of Education Initiatives. His primary responsibility is a focus on students, both K-12 and higher-ed, with an eye towards digital and visual literacy, and the role that Adobe services and tools play in the future of communication and storytelling. He is the author of over 40 technical books (with over 750,000 copies in print) on SQL (including the best-selling SQL book of all time), Regular Expressions, ColdFusion, Windows development, JSP, and more. Many of his books have been translated into over fifteen languages worldwide. Before working for Allaire and Macromedia, he founded the website Car.com, which was later purchased by Auto-By-Tel. Born in London, England, Forta lives in Oak Park, Michigan with his wife and their children.

== Bibliography ==
- Macromedia Coldfusion 5 Language: The Definitive CFML Language Reference Reference. Pearson Education. 2001. ISBN 0-7897-2698-X.
- Reality ColdFusion: Flash MX Integration. Macromedia Press. 2002. ISBN 0-321-12515-0.
- Macromedia ColdFusion MX Development with Dreamweaver MX: Visual QuickPro Guide. Macromedia Press. 2002. ISBN 0-321-15802-4.
- Sams Teach Yourself Regular Expressions in 10 Minutes. Sams. 2004. ISBN 0-672-32566-7.
- Sams Teach Yourself SQL in 10 Minutes. Sams. 2004. ISBN 0-672-32567-5.
- Advanced ColdFusion MX 7 Application Development. Macromedia Press. 2005. ISBN 0-321-29269-3.
- Certified Macromedia ColdFusion MX Developer Study Guide. Macromedia Press. 2005. ISBN 0-321-33011-0.
- MySQL Crash Course. Sams. 2005. ISBN 0-672-32712-0.
- Adobe ColdFusion 8 Web Application Construction Kit, Volume 1: Getting Started. Adobe Press. 2007. ISBN 978-0-321-51548-3.
- Adobe ColdFusion 8 Web Application Construction Kit, Volume 2: Application Development. Adobe Press. 2007. ISBN 978-0-321-51546-9.
- Adobe ColdFusion 8 Web Application Construction Kit, Volume 3: Advanced Application Development. Adobe Press. 2007. ISBN 978-0-321-51547-6.
- Adobe ColdFusion 9 Web Application Construction Kit, Volume 1: Getting Started. Adobe Press. 2010. ISBN 978-0-321-66034-3.
- Adobe ColdFusion 9 Web Application Construction Kit, Volume 2: Application Development. Adobe Press. 2010. ISBN 978-0-321-67919-2.
- MariaDB Crash Course. Addison Wesley. 2011. ISBN 978-0-321-79994-4.

=== Coauthored works ===
- Forta, Ben; Weiss, Nate (1998). The ColdFusion 4.0 Web Application Construction Kit. Que. ISBN 0-7897-1809-X.
- Forta, Ben; Weiss, Nate (1998). Advanced Cold Fusion 4 Application Development. Que. ISBN 0-7897-1810-3.
- Forta, Ben; Hove, Sue (2000). Sams Teach Yourself ColdFusion Express in 24 Hours. Sams. ISBN 0-672-31662-5.
- Forta, Ben; Fonte, Paul; Brewer, Greg (2000). Windows 2000 Developer's Guide. John Wiley & Sons. ISBN 0-7645-4653-8.
- Forta, Ben; Bromby, Dylan; Mandel, Ronan; Fonte, Paul; Lauver, Keith; Juncker, Robert (2000). WAP Development with WML and WMLScript. Sams. ISBN 0-672-31946-2.
- Forta, Ben; Kim, Emily; Bowers, Geoff (2001). Certified Macromedia ColdFusion 5 Developer Study Guide. Pearson Education. ISBN 0-7897-2696-3.
- Forta, Ben; Weiss, Nate; Chalnick, Leon; Crawford, David; Cummings, John; Golden, David (2001). ColdFusion 5 Web Application Construction Kit. Pearson Education. ISBN 0-7897-2584-3.
- Forta, Ben; Elmore, Benjamin; Evans, Shawn; Anderson, Dain; Krasnove, David; Hastings, Paul; Kim, Emily B.; Panico, Robert; Taylor, Jeff; Weiss, Nate (2001). Advanced Macromedia ColdFusion 5 Application Development. Pearson Education. ISBN 0-7897-2585-1.
- Forta, Ben; Baldwin, Dennis; Drisgill, Randy H.; Lu, Derek; Tatam, Matt (2002). Reality Macromedia ColdFusion MX: Macromedia Flash MX Integration. Pearson Education. ISBN 0-321-12515-0.
- Forta, Ben; Weiss, Nate; Chalnick, Leon; Buraglia, Angela (2002). Macromedia ColdFusion MX Web Application Construction Kit. Macromedia Press. ISBN 0-321-12516-9.
- Forta, Ben; Buntel, Tim; Elmore, Ben; Hastings, Paul; O'Hara, Brendan; Sargent, Sheldon; Snortland, Greg; Rusher, Rob; Weiss, Nate (2002). Advanced Macromedia ColdFusion MX Application Development. Macromedia Press. ISBN 0-321-12710-2.
- Forta, Ben; Aden, David; Hindle, Andrew; Milligan, Stephen; Schnell-Davis, David; Stanard, John (2002). Reality ColdFusion: Intranets and Content Management. Pearson Education. ISBN 0-321-12414-6.
- Forta, Ben; Hove, Sue; Crooks, Robert; Kellett, Jay (March 1, 2002). Certified Macromedia Dreamweaver 4 Developer Study Guide. Pearson Education. ISBN 0-7897-2736-6.
- Forta, Ben; Falkman, Drew; Plottner, Bonnie; Cibulskis, Kristian; Arehart, Charles (2002). Reality ColdFusion: J2EE Integration. Macromedia Press. ISBN 0-321-12948-2.
- Forta, Ben; Camden, Raymond; Chalnick, Leon; Buraglia, Angela C. (2005). Macromedia ColdFusion MX 7 Web Application Construction Kit. Macromedia Press. ISBN 0-321-22367-5.
- Forta, Ben; Camden, Raymond; Adams, Josh; Arehart, Charlie; Bouley, Jeffrey; Fricklas, Ken; Rother, Alan; Sargent, Sarge; Tatam, Matt (2010). Adobe ColdFusion 9 Web Application Construction Kit, Volume 3: Advanced Application Development. Adobe Press. ISBN 978-0-321-67920-8.
