= Edmunds (company) =

American automotive resource company

Edmunds.com Inc.
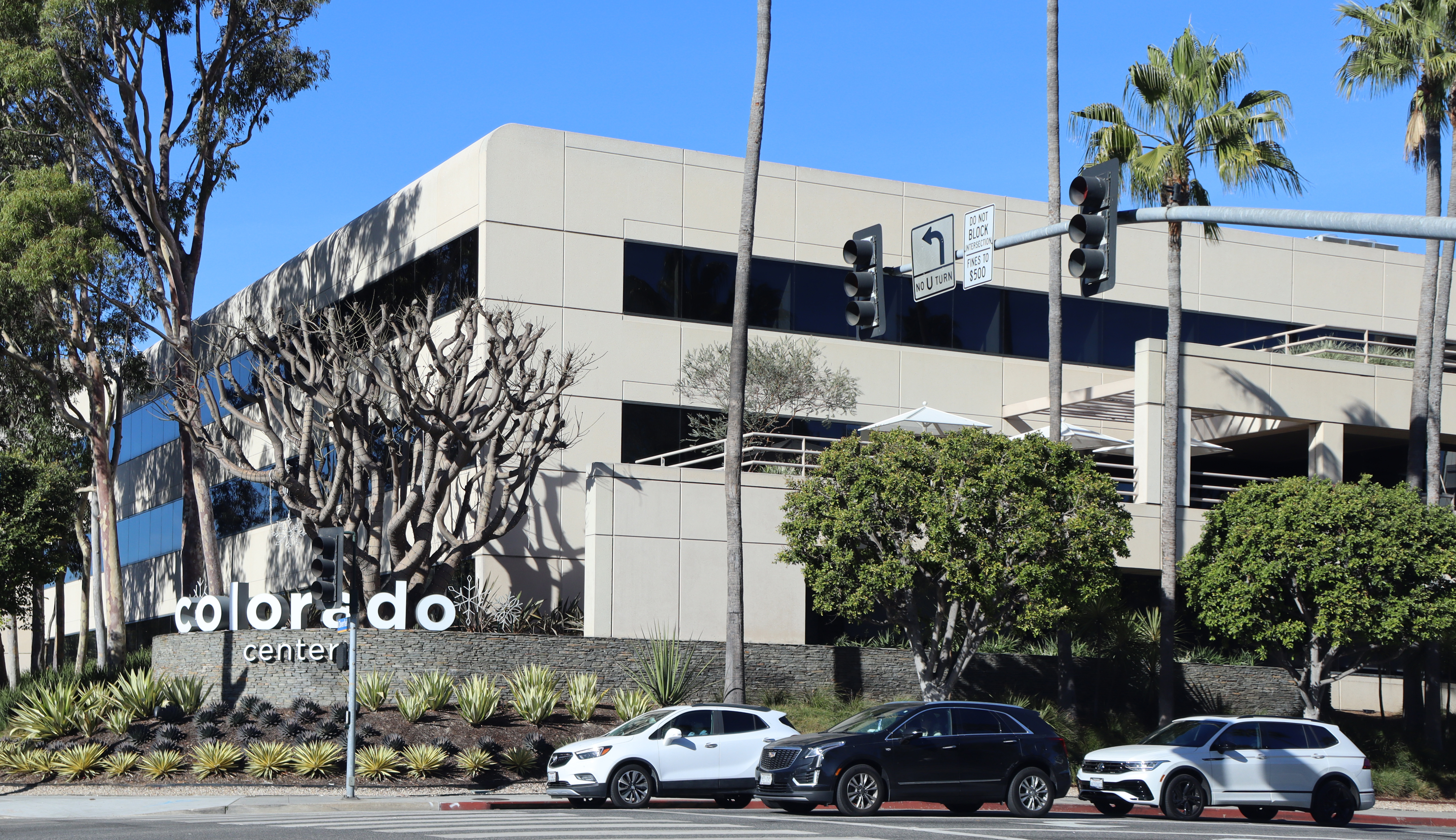
- Edmunds headquarters in Santa Monica
- Formerly: Edmunds.com
- Type: Subsidiary
- Industry: Automotive information services
- Founded: 1966; 60 years ago
- Founder: Ludwig Arons
- Headquarters: Santa Monica, California, U.S.
- Area served: United States
- Key people: Avi Steinlauf (CEO)
- Parent: CarMax (since 2021)
- Website: www.edmunds.com

Edmunds.com Inc. (stylized as edmunds) is an American online resource for automotive inventory and information, including expert car reviews based on testing at the company's private facility. The company is headquartered in Santa Monica, California, and has a satellite office in downtown Detroit, Michigan.

== History ==
Edmunds was founded by Ludwig Arons in 1966 as Edmunds Publications, a publisher of printed booklets consolidating automotive specifications to help car shoppers make buying decisions. In 1988, the company was purchased by Peter Steinlauf whose family has owned a majority stake since.

By the 1990s, Edmunds published its data to CD-ROM while also publishing books such as Edmunds New Cars & Trucks Buyer's Guide, Edmunds Used Cars & Trucks Buyer's Guide and Edmunds Strategies for Smart Car Buyers. In 1994, the company posted on a gopher site known as the Electronic Newsstand. The company launched the Edmunds.com website in 1995. By 1996, the company had formed web commerce agreements with Autobytel, a site linking buyers to nearby dealers, and the auto insurance company Geico. As part of the agreement, each time a lead was generated from the Edmunds.com website, it would get paid a fee. In June 1999, the company changed its name to Edmunds.com, Inc.

In 2000, the company introduced True Market Value, a service that analyzed a variety of factors to offer a suggested transaction price for vehicles. That same year, the company introduced simple websites for web-ready mobile phones and PDAs. In 2005, Edmunds.com launched Inside Line, a free online magazine for automotive enthusiasts. Inside Line delivered automotive content in the form of videos, photos, blogs, news articles, discussion boards and road tests, before it was discontinued in 2013. In 2010, the company launched its first mobile phone apps, 10 years after introducing its mobile website.

In 2011, two years after launching a similar service for new vehicles, the company launched a used car inventory search tool, allowing users to compare vehicles in their market. Edmunds.com launched its first TV advertising campaign in select markets in 2012, before expanding nationally in 2013. That same year, the company announced the Edmunds Price Promise, a feature that allowed users to see the accurate price of a vehicle online and guaranteed by a local dealer. In 2014, Edmunds.com acquired CarCode, a mobile messaging startup that won one of the company's Hackomotive challenges and participated in the company's accelerator program.

In 2016, the company relocated its headquarters to the Colorado Center in Santa Monica, California. In 2017, as part of a rebranding effort, the company officially dropped the .com from its name, unveiled a new logo, and redesigned its website to aid mobile users.

In 2020, CarMax acquired a minority stake in Edmunds. The following year, they purchased remaining stake of the company making it a wholly owned subsidiary of CarMax.

== Events ==
Edmunds.com announced that it would begin hosting a Hackathon event in September 2012. The event, named Hackomotive, was held in March 2013 and awarded the winners a combined $28,000. The resulting ideas were published on the Edmunds Hackomotive website, and some ideas were further evaluated by the company. Edmunds.com ran the Hackathon from 2013–15, before taking a year-long break from the event.

In 2014, Edmunds.com launched Car Week, a seven-day event to connect car dealers with buyers and offering prices below the Edmunds.com "True Market Value".

== Services ==
The Edmunds.com website includes prices for new and used vehicles, dealer and inventory listings, a database of national and regional incentives and rebates, vehicle test drive reviews, and tips and advice on all aspects of car purchases and ownership. Edmunds.com provides data through its "True Market Value" pricing tools, which launched in 2000. The Edmunds.com True Market Value New Vehicle Calculator displays the estimated average price consumers are paying when buying new vehicles. The Edmunds.com True Market Value Used Vehicle Appraiser estimates the actual transaction prices for used vehicles bought and sold by dealers and private parties.

In 2020, Edmunds launched a partnership with CarMax that allows a driver to receive a no-obligation cash offer for their vehicle which can be redeemed at any CarMax location.

== Recognition ==
In 1997, the Edmunds.com website earned a Webby Award in the Money category at the inaugural event. The company has been ranked as one of the best places to work by The Wall Street Journal and the Los Angeles Business Journal. Edmunds.com was named to Fast Company's World's Top 10 Most Innovative Companies of 2015 in Automotive. In 2016, Edmunds.com was ranked 26th on Fortune's Best Small and Medium Companies list.
