= Ferndale Public Schools =

School district in Michigan

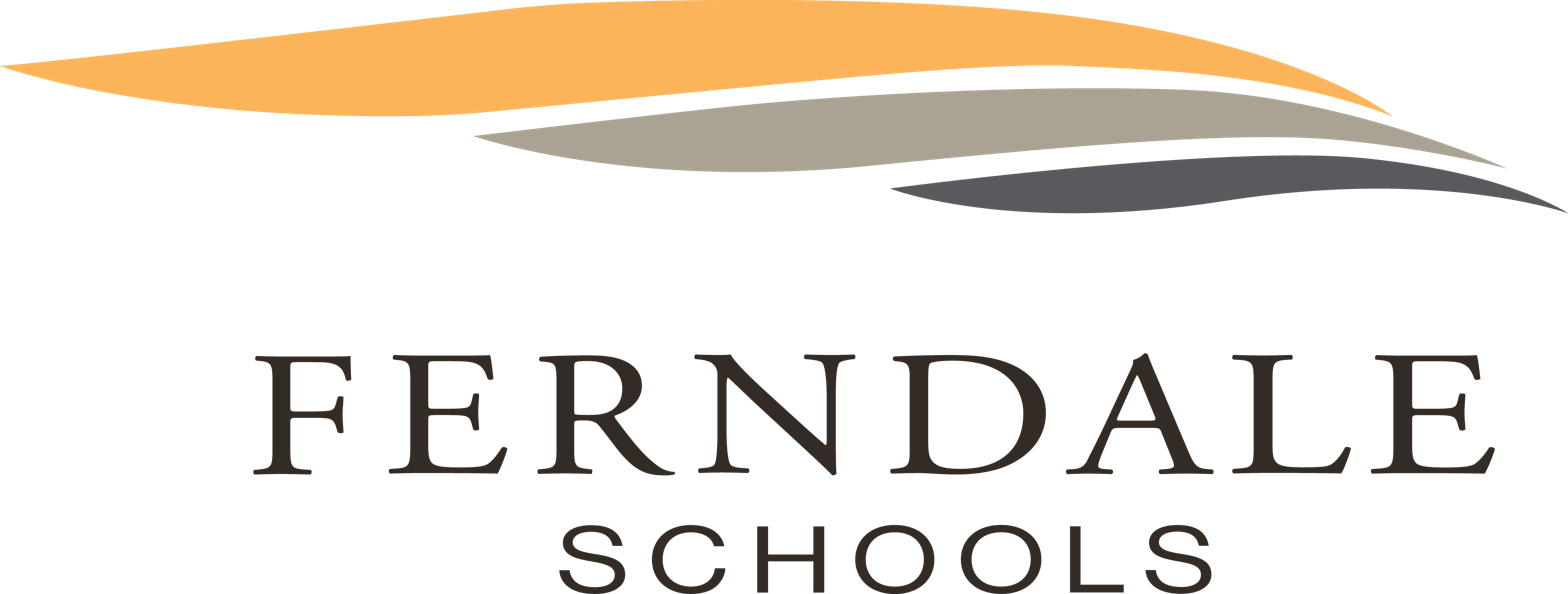
- 2610 Pinecrest Pleasant Ridge, Oakland County, Michigan, 48220

District information
- Type: Public
- Grades: PreK-12
- Superintendent: Camille Hibber
- Schools: 7
- Budget: $79,818,000 2022-2023 expenditures
- NCES District ID: 2614280

Students and staff
- Students: 3,137 (2024-2025)
- Teachers: 181.8 FTE (2024-2025)
- Staff: 437.86 FTE (2024-2025)
- Student–teacher ratio: 17.26 (2024-2025)

Other information
- Website: www.ferndaleschools.org

Ferndale Public Schools is a public school district in Metro Detroit in the U.S. state of Michigan, serving most of Ferndale, all of Pleasant Ridge, and portions of Oak Park and Royal Oak Township.

== History ==
In the 1870s, a schoolhouse was built at the corner of Woodward Avenue and Nine Mile Road. It was replaced by a wooden building on the same site in 1909, but that building burned on December 28, 1914. It was rebuilt a year later in brick, and became known as Ferndale Central School. The building remains as commercial space.

Another one of the earliest schools in the district was the Ridge Road School on Pinecrest Road in Pleasant Ridge. A previous building had been built around 1913 and was moved to face Oakridge Boulevard when the present building, Roosevelt School, was built in 1921. Designed by Charles Fisher of Pontiac, it opened in October 1921. The Ridge Road School was torn down by 1926, as additions were built at Roosevelt School. Further additions were built in 1936, 1949 and 1969. It housed grades kindergarten to eight until 1959, and was then an elementary school before becoming the district's administration building in 2024.

1918 saw the first graduating class of Ferndale--two students. The district was seeing fast population growth and by 1920, Lincoln High School was built at the northeast corner of Livernois and Nine Mile Rd. It was designed by the Fisher brothers, architectural partners based in Pontiac. Although Ferndale's only high school, the district had a tradition of naming schools after United States presidents until the 1950s. When Ferndale High School was completed in January 1959, Lincoln became a junior high. It was demolished in 1976 and the site became a supermarket.

Sixteen months after Roosevelt School opened, George Washington Elementary opened with a similar design. It operated until June 2000, then became the Kulick Community Center, which closed in 2020. Other schools that were built in the 1920s were Coolidge, Grant, Jefferson, Taft and Wilson.

Jackson Elementary opened in 1950 and closed at the end of the 2001-2002 school year. Former Michigan Governor James J. Blanchard was one of the school's first students and attended its closing celebration. In fall 2002, the building became the Center for Advanced Studies and the Arts, also known as Jackson Center, a school with advanced classes that students of six area school districts may attend. The building was torn down in 2024 with the construction of Ferndale Lower Elementary on the same site.

Paul L. Best School opened in fall 1954, named for an assistant superintendent who had recently died. In 1976, with the closure of Lincoln Junior High, Coolidge and Best Elementaries became junior high schools.

Several schools were renovated or expanded in the late 1990s as part of the 1995 bond issue. Harding Elementary, also built in 1921, was rebuilt in 1999 around the existing gymnasium, which remained. Coolidge Middle School, now University High School, was built as part of this bond issue, replacing the former Coolidge school.

=== Controversy over progressive education ===
In the 1950s, the area of the school district serving Oak Park was embroiled in a controversy over progressive education. Andrew Jackson School opened to serve this area in fall 1950. It was unlike existing district schools, both in terms of education and the building itself. Designed by Modernist architect Eberle M. Smith, the school's classrooms were essentially open to the corridors, contained tables rather than desks, and were connected directly to single-stall bathrooms that were not gendered by signage. (Note: Based on the following quote from the cited news article, the students ultimately created signage for the bathrooms in a project illustrative of progressive education: "On a recent inspection tour, (school board member) Dr. DiGuilio noted that classroom toilets were not marked "boys" and "girls". He claimed that both sexes were using the same facilities. Teachers and Street denied this. They claimed that the use of the proper plumbing by the appropriate sex was no problem. But to bar future criticism of this type, the toilets are now plainly marked. But in line with their new "functional" teaching methods, youngsters down to the second grade made a project out of the names they wanted on the doors and their proper spelling." Griffith, John. "Oak Park parents defend new methods in education." January 27, 1952: Detroit Free Press, page 4.) Principal Scott Street, with the backing of Superintendent Roy Robinson, worked with parents in developing flexible teaching methods that caused disagreement amongst parent-teacher associations at other district schools and some school board members.

Devotees of progressive education were outraged when, in February 1959, the school board demoted Principal Street from his position at Paul L. Best School, a newer school down the street from Jackson School.

The School Board claimed Street had been openly campaigning against certain school board members. By that July, eleven teachers had resigned in the district, many in protest of the school board. Street accepted a superintendent position with the U.S. Army in Libya before becoming a principal in Ypsilanti in 1962.

=== Federal racial discrimination cases ===
Throughout the 1970s, the district was involved in court battles over the racial segregation of Grant Elementary. The district had built Grant in 1926 in Royal Oak Township, a majority-Black area outside of the majority-white city of Ferndale where, even as late as 1944, there was no sewer system and inadequate police protection. An investigation by the federal Department of Health, Education and Welfare into segregation of Grant Elementary was begun around 1968. Meanwhile, several Black parents formed an organization to pressure the district to improve and threatened a boycott by Black students.

The district's appeal of the Federal Department of Health, Education and Welfare's order to desegregate went to the Supreme Court of the United States, which in 1973 declined to review the case. However, the litigation continued for years, with Ferndale ultimately losing most of its federal funding as it created a special program within Grant Elementary that was mostly white. The Justice Department stated that this did not solve the problem of segregation at Grant.

Ultimately, a Federal Court judge found that the school district had practiced de jure segregation by allowing Grant to be overcrowded with Black students while other district schools, which were all more than ninety percent white, were under capacity. On October 7, 1980, the United States District Court for the Eastern District of Michigan issued a plan by which Ferndale's elementary schools would be integrated by reassigning some students to different schools.

=== District restructuring ===
On November 29, 2001, the Ferndale school board approved a restructuring plan that eliminated neighborhood schools and instead grouped students from across the district into schools based on grade level. The plan was designed to avert a financial crisis, after a decline of about 1,000 students between 1992 and 2001, and the corresponding drop in revenue. The restructuring was implemented in fall 2002, when grades seven and eight joined the high school students in the high school building. Roosevelt became a building for grades kindergarten through second, Wilson took grades three and four, Coolidge became a fifth and sixth grade building, and Best became a magnet school. In February 2005, the district planned to move grade three to Roosevelt and grade four to Coolidge. This would free Wilson to become University High School, a school for teaching skills of the automotive industry in partnership with Lawrence Technological University.

In 2015, the district began another extensive restructuring process, led by the Board of Education and deeply dependent on community involvement. Changes to curriculum, expansion of academic opportunities for students and site transitions were all based on the district's strategic plan.

Among other changes in the district were the restructuring of elementary schools. Kennedy and Roosevelt Elementaries were experiencing de facto segregation, with the majority-Black Roosevelt School being open to all and the Kennedy School (in the former Paul L. Best Elementary building) admitting students by lottery. To eliminate the segregation and different levels of parent involvement and student achievement, Kennedy became Ferndale Upper Elementary and Roosevelt became Ferndale Lower Elementary in fall 2016. University High School moved to the Coolidge building from the Wilson building, which closed.

== Schools ==
Ferndale Schools
School	Address	Built	Notes
Ferndale Early Childhood Center	2920 Burdette St., Ferndale	1999	Preschool, formerly Harding Elementary / Harding Administration Building. Harding School was built in 1921 and rebuilt in 1999.
Ferndale High School	881 Pinecrest St., Ferndale	1958	Comprehensive high school (9-12)
Ferndale Lower Elementary School	23501 Rosewood St., Oak Park	Fall 2024	Grades K-2. Built on the site of Jackson Elementary/Center for Advanced Studies and the Arts
Ferndale Middle School	725 Pinecrest St., Ferndale	1958	6-8, shares a building with Ferndale High School
Ferndale Upper Elementary School	24220 Rosewood, Oak Park	1954	3-5, Formerly Kennedy Elementary
Tri-County Educational Center	8711 Cloverdale St., Royal Oak Township	1926	Adult and alternative high school (9-12). Formerly Grant Elementary.
University High School	2521 Bermuda St., Ferndale		College-Prep high school (9-12), formerly Coolidge Intermediate School / Coolidge Middle School

== Former schools ==
Former Schools
School	Address	Notes
Best School	24220 Rosewood, Oak Park	Renamed Kennedy, now Upper Elementary
Central School	130 E Nine Mile Rd., Ferndale	Built 1915, became district offices, now commercial office space.
Coolidge Intermediate School	2521 Bermuda St., Ferndale	Now University High School
Grant School	8711 Cloverdale St., Royal Oak Township	Built 1926, now Tri-County Educational Center, also Royal Oak Township library and township hall
Harding School	2920 Burdette St., Ferndale	Originally known as Urbanrest School. Now Ferndale Early Childhood Center
Jackson School	23561 Rosewood St., Oak Park	Opened fall 1950. Became Center for Advanced Studies and the Arts. Demolished 2024, Lower Elementary built on site.
Jefferson Center	22001 Republic St., Oak Park	Became residential units
John F. Kennedy Elementary School	24220 Rosewood, Oak Park	Formerly Paul L. Best Elementary, now Upper Elementary
Lincoln High School, later Lincoln Junior High School		Opened 1921, district's high school prior to 1958. Demolished 1979.
Ridgewood School	Eight Mile Rd. at Livernois, Ferndale	Built 1917, demolished 1927 during the widening of Eight Mile Road.
Roosevelt Primary School	2610 Pinecrest Dr, Ferndale	Formerly known as Pleasant Ridge School and Ridge Road School. Opened October 1921. Now district offices. Became district administration building in 2024.
Taft Digital Learning Center	427 Allen St, Ferndale	Opened January 1928, became adult education center in 2002, closed 2016, demolished 2017.
Washington School	1201 Livernois St, Ferndale	Built 1923. Became Kulick Community Center, now closed
Wilson University High School	1244 Paxton St., Ferndale	Built 1923, closed 2016, demolished 2017.
