= Larry Downes =

Larry Downes (born March 1, 1959) is an Internet industry analyst and author on business strategies and information technology. Downes is best known for his first book, Unleashing the Killer App: Digital Strategies for Market Dominance (Harvard Business School 1998), which focuses on the potential of products and services for dramatically changing business. Unleashing the Killer App was a New York Times bestseller, sold over 200,000 copies, and was named by the Wall Street Journal one of the five most important books on business and the Internet ever published.

Downes is also the author of The Strategy Machine: Building Your Business One Idea at a Time (HarperBusiness 2001) and The Laws of Disruption: Harnessing the New Forces that Govern Business and Life in the Digital Age (Basic Books 2009), and co-author or Big Bang Disruption: Strategy in the Age of Devastating Innovation (Portfolio 2014).

His most recent book is Pivot to the Future (Public Affairs 2019), which was Amazon's best-selling strategy title for April and May 2019.

Downes writes regularly for a variety of publications, including The Washington Post, Harvard Business Review, Forbes and CNET about such issues as privacy, the Internet of Things, streaming media, net neutrality, the U.S. Federal Communications Commission (FCC), and disruptive innovation generally.

He has testified frequently before Congress on technology policy. On February 15, 2011, he testified in front of Congress against the FCC's net neutrality rules, the so-called "Open Internet" rule, which prohibits blocking of lawful content and bans various forms of discrimination in the handling of specific data packets. He is a critic of over-regulation and an advocate of increased competition. His writings have appeared in various newspapers and magazines around the world, including Forbes, CNET, USA Today, Harvard Business Review, Wired, The Washington Post, MIT Sloan Management Review, The Economist, and the Harvard Journal of Law & Technology.

Downes held a faculty appointment at the Northwestern University School of Law from 1998 to 2001 where he taught courses on The Law of Technology. He also held a faculty appointment at the Booth School of Business from 1999 to 2000. He was an adjunct professor at the University of California, Berkeley from 2003 to 2007, where he was Associate Dean of the School of Information and at the Haas School of Business. From 2006 to 2010, he was a nonresident Fellow at the Stanford Center for Internet and Society.

From 2014, he was appointed a project director at the Georgetown Center for Business and Public Policy's Evolution of Regulation and Innovation project, housed at the McDonough School of Business at Georgetown University. He also serves as distinguished fellow for the Accenture Research.

In 2020, Downes served as editor-in-chief and co-author, with Blair Levin, of The Lewis Latimer Plan for Digital Equity and Inclusion, a report from the National Urban League published in 2021. The Latimer Plan formed the basis of broadband funding and regulatory reform provisions included in the bi-partisan Infrastructure Investment and Jobs Act (2021).

Downes received his BA from Northwestern University in 1980 with Honors in English, History, and Computer Science. He received his J.D. with High Honors from the University of Chicago Law School in 1993. From 1993 to 1994, he served as law clerk for the Hon. Richard Posner, Chief Judge, United States Court of Appeals for the Seventh Circuit. He was also a consultant with Andersen Consulting (now Accenture) and McKinsey & Co from 1980 to 1990.

He grew up in Oak Park, Michigan, graduating from Oak Park High School.
