= Vladimir Shmondenko (weightlifter) =

Ukrainian powerlifter

Volodymyr Shmondenko
- Володимир Шмонденко
- Powerlifter

Personal info
- Born: 10 August 1999 (age 27); Khrystynivka, Cherkasy Oblast or Pavlohrad, Dnipropetrovsk Oblast, Ukraine

Best statistics
- Bench press: 150 kg (330 lb) (bench); 320 kg (710 lb) (deadlift); 210 kg (460 lb) (squat)
- Height: 1.80 m (5 ft 11 in)
- Weight: 78 kg (172 lb)

Instagram information
- Page: vladimirshmondenko
- Followers: 24.7 million

TikTok information
- Page: anatoly_pranks
- Followers: 23.8 million

YouTube information
- Channels: Anatoly; Владимир Шмонденко
- Years active: 2015–present
- Genre: Comedy
- Subscribers: 8.91 million
- Views: 2.09 billion
- Last updated: 2026-07-30

Vladimir Shmondenko, known as Anatoly, is a Ukrainian powerlifter notable for his gym prank videos. Anatoly pretends to be a janitor before lifting and moving barbell equipment (either single- or double-handed) in front of other gym attendees. For the video pranks, Anatoly uses a custom mop and bucket, each weighing 32 kilograms (71 lb).

== Competition ==
Anatoly built his first gym from old tractor parts, car wheels, and bricks.

During 2017 and 2018 Shmondenko twice won the Teenager category of the Kyiv Cup weightlifting competition. In 2018 he took third place at the Teenager 18‒19 category of the GPA World Championships.

== Career ==
Anatoly's first video was uploaded in December 2015. For the first three years, Shmondenko created only factual fitness material.

In 2019 Shmondenko moved to Moscow and started creating Russian-language gym prank videos. Due to the Russian invasion of Ukraine he moved to Dubai and began creating gym prank videos in English. In 2022, Anatoly and power lifter Larry Wheels produced an hour-long video together. Shmondenko started to film with an old man disguise, including at Muscle Beach, in California.

As of June 2025 video thumbnails were using pictures of models Katie and Lauren Hamden. In mid-2025, Anatoly trained and met with Arnold Schwarzenegger.

In a September 2026 video, exercise scientist Mike Israetel of Renaissance Periodization analysed several of Shmondenko’s prank videos and concluded that fake (underweight) weight plates are frequently used. Israetel pointed to the repeated appearance of certain thick grey bumper plates, the absence of expected bar bend under loads that appear to exceed 300–400 lb, and other biomechanical inconsistencies, ultimately rating the presented lifts as “fake.”

== Personal life ==
Shmondenko initially worked in landscape gardening, then worked as a waiter and courier. He moved to Moscow in 2019, and then to Dubai in 2022.

As of 2023, Shmondenko had an estimated net worth of £1.45 million. As of 2025, Shmondenko is the owner of Arriba Nutrition, with its range of "Mr Anatoly Clean Pro" dietary supplements. By 2025, Shmondenko's worth was estimated to be $2‒3 million. He lives with his partner, Valeria Shirshova, a model.
