= Oak Park School District =

School district in Michigan

Address
- 13900 Granzon St. Oak Park, Oakland, Michigan, 48237; United States

District information
- Type: Public school district
- Grades: Prekindergarten-12
- Established: 1951
- Schools: 7
- Budget: $79,621,000 2022-2023 expenditures
- NCES District ID: 2626190

Students and staff
- Students: 3,011 (2024-2025)
- Teachers: 171.6 FTE (2024-2025)
- Staff: 414.7 FTE (2024-2025)
- Student–teacher ratio: 17.55 (2024-2025)

Other information
- Website: www.oakparkschools.org

The Oak Park School District is a public school district in Metro Detroit in the U.S. state of Michigan, serving most of Oak Park, and portions of Royal Oak Township and Southfield.

== History ==
The district began with Clinton School, a one-room schoolhouse near the present-day Nova Academy. The south side of the Clinton School District was home to Wineman School.

In 1945, the Wineman School area was growing rapidly due to Oakdale Gardens, a housing project for African Americans in Royal Oak Township. In 1945, whites in the district circulated a petition demanding that the district be split on racial lines. The school board, which had one Black member and two white members, agreed. The division removed seven-eighths of the taxable value from the original district. The new district would be known as George Washington Carver School District. It would ultimately be reabsorbed into the Oak Park School District in 1960.

In 1949, Clinton School District's enrollment was 51 students, and it was 140 in fall 1950. Its facilities included the old schoolhouse and a 2-classroom building for which a five-room addition was being planned.

With the hiring of superintendent James Nelson Pepper in August 1951, the school district began to modernize to fit the needs of the fast-growing city. By the end of that year, the Oak Park School District had changed its name from the Clinton School District.

Prior to Oak Park High School opening to grades nine and ten in 1953, high school students in the district attended high schools in Berkley, Royal Oak or Clawson. The high school was planned and built in sections, with 14 classrooms opening in fall 1953. As grades eleven and twelve were added by fall 1957, the school had 50 classrooms, its gymnasiums and auditorium.

Nine new schools were built between 1951 and 1963. The district hired O'Dell, Hewlett and Luckenbach architects to design new schools. The Michigan Society of Architects showed four Oak Park schools in its July 1957 magazine: The high school, Clinton Junior High School (now Nova Academy), and Dewey and Lessenger Elementaries.

== Schools ==
School	Address	Notes
Einstein Elementary	14001 Northend	
Key Elementary	23400 Jerome	
Lessenger Early Childhood Center	12901 Albany	Preschool located in former Lessenger Elementary
Nova Academy	22180 Parklawn	Alternative high school and middle school, formerly Clinton Junior High School
Oak Park High School	13701 Oak Park Blvd	Grades 9-12, built 1953
Oak Park Preparatory Academy	23261 Scotia	Grades 6-8, formerly Frost Junior High School. Built 1963 Also formerly known as Roosevelt Middle School.
Pepper Elementary	24301 Church	

=== Former schools ===
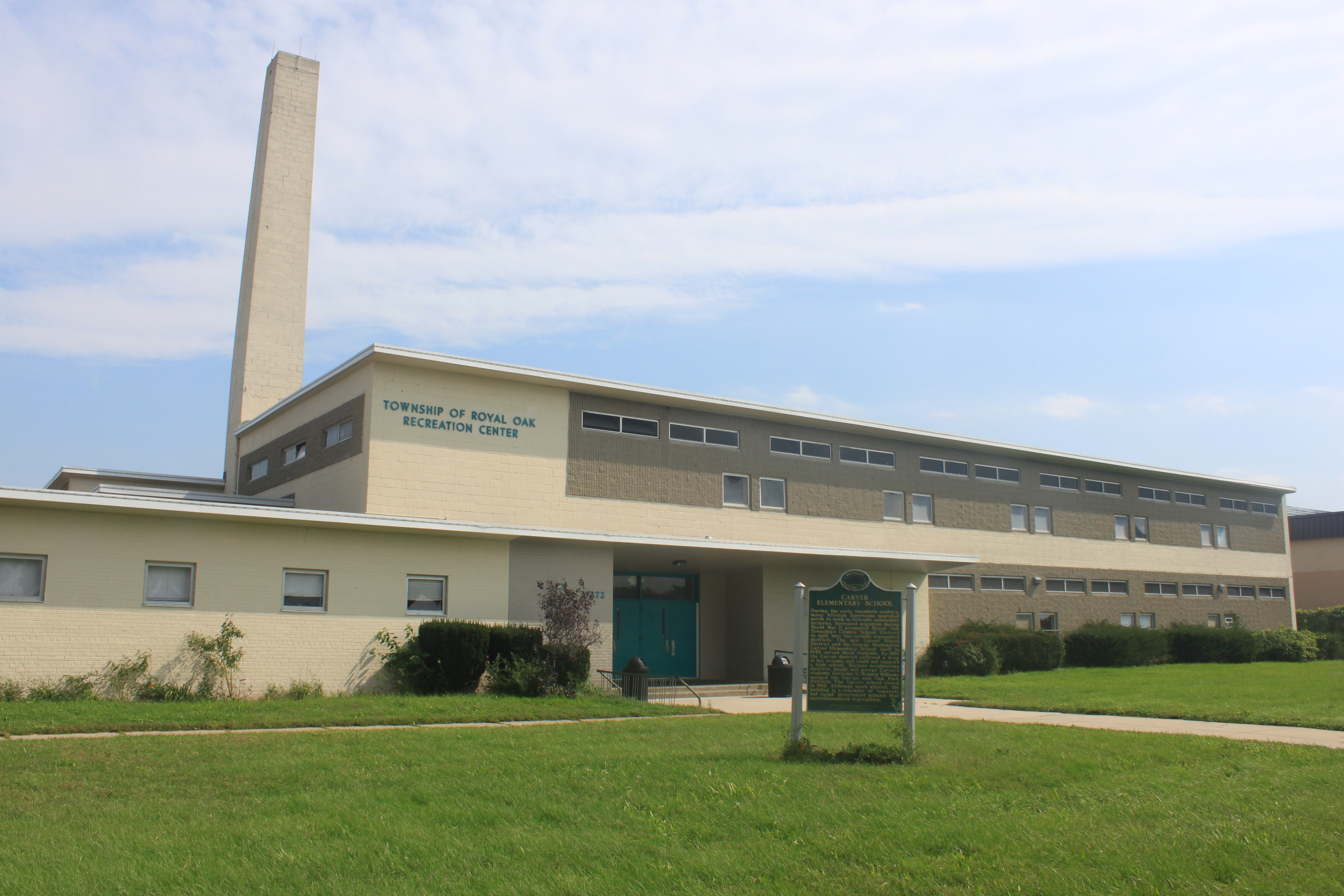
The former George Washington Carver Elementary School, now the Township of Royal Oak Recreation Center

- George Washington Carver Elementary School (Royal Oak Township) - Joined in 1960, closed in 1982

In 1960, Governor of Michigan G. Mennen Williams consolidated the majority black George Washington Carver School District, along with its elementary school, into the Oak Park School District because the Carver district no longer had sufficient taxes to pay for a senior high school services, and no area school districts voluntarily took its students for high school.

- Dewey Elementary, 21700 Marlow St. Became Oak Park Service Learning Academy charter school.
