= Oak Park, Michigan =

- City
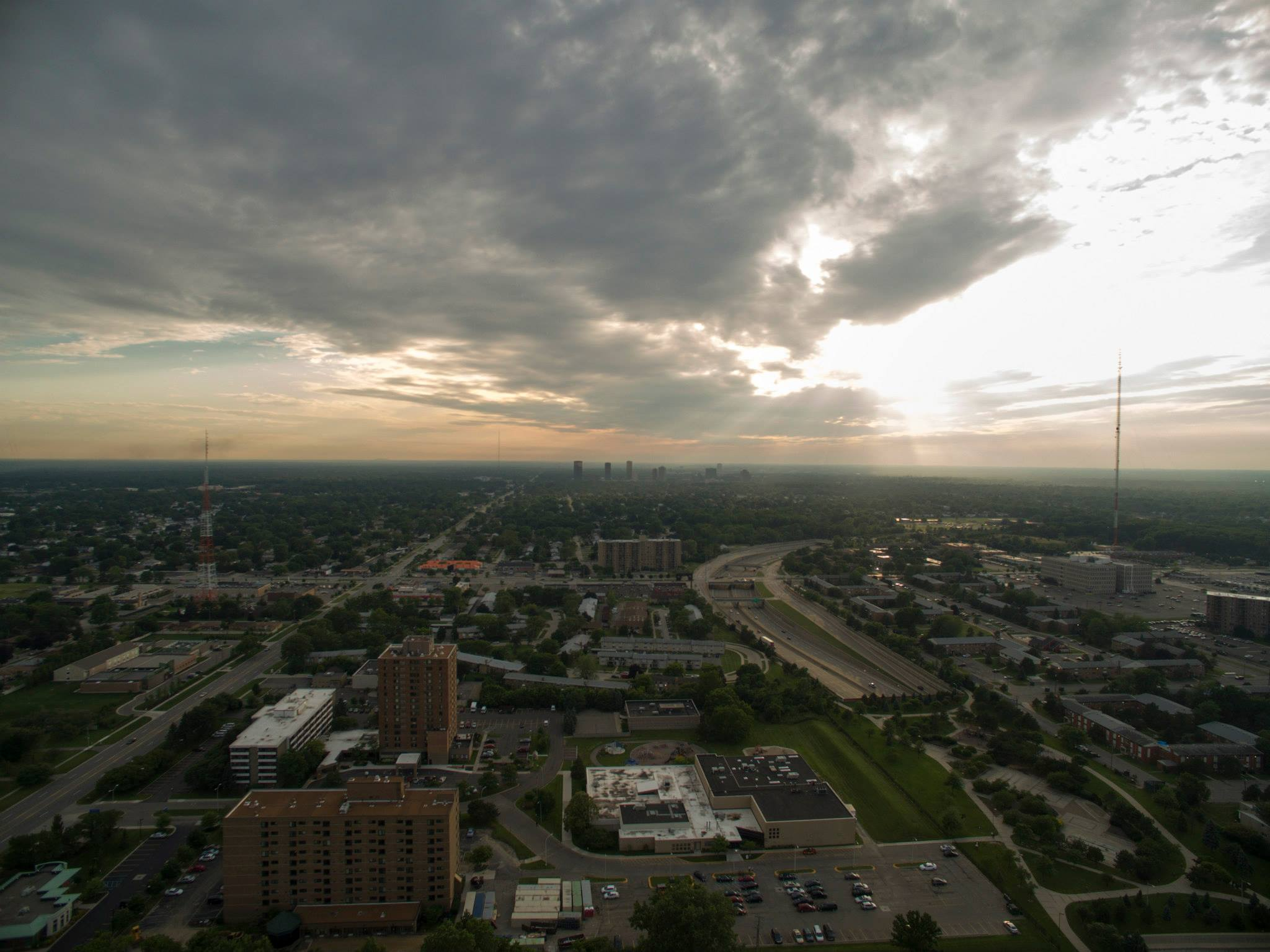
- Aerial view of Oak Park over Interstate 696

- Flag Seal
- Motto: "Community. Culture. Commerce."
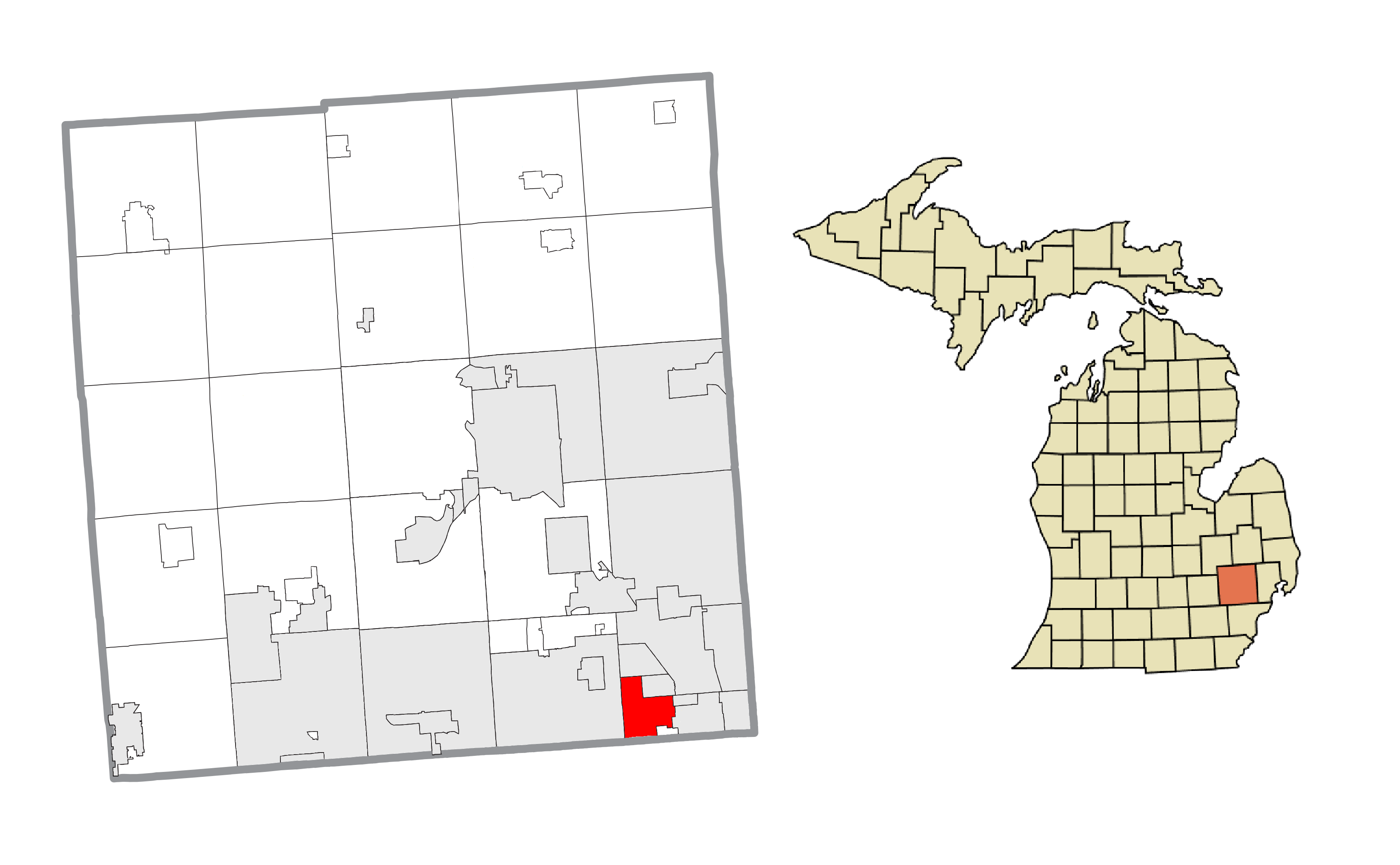
- Location within Oakland County

- Location within the state of Michigan
- Coordinates: 42°28′02″N 83°10′46″W
- Country: United States
- State: Michigan
- County: Oakland
- Settled: 1914
- Incorporated: 1927 (village); 1945 (city)

Government
  - Type: Mayor–council
  - Mayor: Marian McClellan
  - Manager: Erik Tungate

Area
  - City: 5.15 sq mi (13.33 km^{2})
  - Land: 5.15 sq mi (13.33 km^{2})
  - Water: 0 sq mi (0.00 km^{2})
- Elevation: 666 ft (203 m)

Population (2020)
  - City: 29,560
  - Density: 5,743.4/sq mi (2,217.52/km^{2})
  - Metro: 4,392,041 (Metro Detroit)
- Time zone: UTC-5 (EST)
  - Summer (DST): UTC-4 (EDT)
- ZIP code(s): 48237
- Area codes: 248 and 947
- FIPS code: 26-59920
- GNIS feature ID: 0633849
- Website: www.oakparkmi.gov

Oak Park is a city in Oakland County in the U.S. state of Michigan. An inner-ring suburb of Detroit, Oak Park borders Detroit to the north, roughly 14 miles (22.5 km) northwest of downtown Detroit. As of the 2020 census, the city had a population of 29,560.

== History ==
This area was designated as within Royal Oak Township; it was first settled by European Americans in 1840, but remained sparsely populated for many decades following. The first major housing development was constructed in 1914 at the time of World War I, when the township sold land to the Majestic Land Company to be developed as the Oak Park subdivision. The subdivision was incorporated as a village on May 3, 1927. Two petition drives during the Great Depression to dissolve the village government and return it to the township, citing "excessively high cost of village government," failed in 1931 and 1933. The village incorporated as a city on October 29, 1945, following the end of World War II.

Stimulated by the GI Bill which aided veterans in buying new housing, highways to improve commuting, and planned developments in the late 1950s, Oak Park from 1950 to 1960 was named as "America's Fastest Growing City". Its population increased sevenfold, from 5,000 to more than 36,000. Much of its population was second- and third-generation children of European immigrants who had settled in Detroit in the early 20th century. These included many Jewish Americans, many of whom are of the Orthodox faith. Major civic improvements in this period included construction of an outdoor swimming pool and an ice rink in Major Park (now known as Shepherd Park, after former mayor David Shepherd, but long known informally as Oak Park Park).

In 1995, Detroit-based window manufacturer WeatherGard moved its headquarters to Oak Park.

In 2002 and 2004, the city annexed portions of neighboring Royal Oak Township to expand its land and tax base.

On November 8, 2011, the citizens of Oak Park elected a new mayor, Marian McClellan. She was the city's first new mayor in 22 years, replacing the long-serving Jerry Naftaly.

In April 2015, the city approved the development of a new FedEx distribution center which will be located on a 60-acre plot of land at the site of the former Detroit Artillery Armory. The facility opened on March 31, 2017.

On May 5, 2015, the citizens of Oak Park voted to allow mixed drinks to be sold at businesses within city limits, in addition to beer and wine, which were previously allowed.

On November 3, 2015, the citizens of Oak Park re-elected McClellan, who was running against Aaron Tobin.

== Geography ==
According to the United States Census Bureau, the city has a total area of 5.16 square miles (13.36 km^{2}), all of it land.

Oak Park is adjacent to the cities of Detroit to the south, Southfield to the west, Pleasant Ridge, Ferndale, and Royal Oak Township to the east, Huntington Woods to the northeast, and Berkley to the north.

Oak Park is bordered to the south by 8 Mile Road (M-102), to the north by 11 Mile Road, to the Northeast by Coolidge Highway and 10 Mile Road/I-696, to the west by Greenfield Road, to the east by Sherman Street and Forest Street, and to the southeast by 9 Mile Road, Republic Street, Northend Avenue, and Meyers Avenue.

=== Major highways ===
- I-696 (Walter P. Reuther Freeway) passes through the northernmost part of the city and forms its northern border with Huntington Woods. The Detroit Zoo is located on the opposite side of the freeway in Huntington Woods and Royal Oak.
- M-102 (8 Mile Road) is the Oakland-Wayne county line and forms Oak Park's entire southernmost border with the city of Detroit.
- M-10 (John C. Lodge Freeway) is a major thoroughfare near the city.

== Demographics ==
Historical population
Census	Pop.	Note	%±
1930	1,079		—
1940	1,169		8.3%
1950	5,267		350.6%
1960	36,632		595.5%
1970	36,762		0.4%
1980	31,537		−14.2%
1990	30,468		−3.4%
2000	29,739		−2.4%
2010	29,319		−1.4%
2020	29,560		0.8%
U.S. Decennial Census

=== Racial and ethnic composition ===
Oak Park, Michigan – Racial and ethnic composition Note: the US Census treats Hispanic/Latino as an ethnic category. This table excludes Latinos from the racial categories and assigns them to a separate category. Hispanics/Latinos may be of any race.
Race / Ethnicity (NH = Non-Hispanic)	Pop 2000	Pop 2010	Pop 2020	% 2000	% 2010	% 2020
White (NH)	13,813	10,806	10,721	46.36%	36.86%	36.27%
Black or African American (NH)	13,622	16,748	16,328	45.72%	57.12%	55.24%
Native American or Alaska Native (NH)	50	54	47	0.17%	0.18%	0.16%
Asian (NH)	645	417	434	2.16%	1.42%	1.47%
Native Hawaiian or Pacific Islander alone (NH)	5	3	10	0.02%	0.01%	0.03%
Other race alone (NH)	98	48	195	0.33%	0.16%	0.66%
Mixed race or Multiracial (NH)	1,179	820	1,177	3.96%	2.80%	3.98%
Hispanic or Latino (any race)	381	423	648	1.28%	1.44%	2.19%
Total	29,793	29,319	29,560	100.00%	100.00%	100.00%

=== 2020 census ===
As of the 2020 census, Oak Park had a population of 29,560. The median age was 37.3 years. 21.5% of residents were under the age of 18 and 16.6% of residents were 65 years of age or older. For every 100 females there were 85.7 males, and for every 100 females age 18 and over there were 80.6 males age 18 and over.

100.0% of residents lived in urban areas, while 0.0% lived in rural areas.

There were 12,395 households in Oak Park, of which 27.5% had children under the age of 18 living in them. Of all households, 31.2% were married-couple households, 20.0% were households with a male householder and no spouse or partner present, and 41.1% were households with a female householder and no spouse or partner present. About 33.2% of all households were made up of individuals and 12.7% had someone living alone who was 65 years of age or older.

There were 12,965 housing units, of which 4.4% were vacant. The homeowner vacancy rate was 1.1% and the rental vacancy rate was 4.8%.

Racial composition as of the 2020 census
Race	Number	Percent
White	10,877	36.8%
Black or African American	16,425	55.6%
American Indian and Alaska Native	62	0.2%
Asian	442	1.5%
Native Hawaiian and Other Pacific Islander	10	0.0%
Some other race	305	1.0%
Two or more races	1,439	4.9%
Hispanic or Latino (of any race)	648	2.2%

=== 2010 census ===
As of the census of 2010, there were 29,319 people, 11,719 households, and 7,533 families residing in the city. The population density was 5,682.0 inhabitants per square mile (2,193.8/km^{2}). There were 12,782 housing units at an average density of 2,477.1 units per square mile (956.4 units/km^{2}). The racial makeup of the city was 57.4% African American, 37.4% White, 1.4% Asian, 0.2% Native American, 0.5% from other races, and 3.0% from two or more races. Hispanic or Latino residents of any race were 1.4% of the population.

There were 11,719 households, of which 35.7% were non-families, 35.4% were married couples living together, 33.3% had children under the age of 18 living with them, 23.9% had a female householder with no husband present, and 5.1% had a male householder with no wife present. 30.9% of all households were made up of individuals, and 11% had someone living alone who was 65 years of age or older. The average household size was 2.50 and the average family size was 3.16.

The median age in the city was 37.5 years. 24.9% of residents were under the age of 18; 9.6% were between the ages of 18 and 24; 25.7% were from 25 to 44; 26.9% were from 45 to 64; and 12.9% were 65 years of age or older. The gender makeup of the city was 45.1% male and 54.9% female.

=== 2000 census ===
As of the census of 2000, there were 29,793 people, 11,104 households, and 7,595 families residing in the city. The population density was 2,291.5 people/km^{2} (5,935 people/mi^{2}). There were 11,370 housing units at an average density of 874.5 units/km^{2} (2,265 units/mi^{2}). The racial makeup of the city was 46.95% White, 45.95% African American, 2.18% Asian, 0.17% Native American, 0.02% Pacific Islander, 0.60% from other races, and 4.13% from two or more races. 1.28% of the population were Hispanic or Latino of any race.

There were 11,104 households, out of which 44.0% were married couples living together, 34.4% had children under the age of 18 living with them, 31.6% were non-families, and 19.5% had a female householder with no husband present. 26.6% of all households were made up of individuals, and 10.4% had someone living alone who was 65 years of age or older. The average household size was 2.68 and the average family size was 3.29.

In the city, 28.2% of the population was under the age of 18, 8.0% was from 18 to 24, 29.8% from 25 to 44, 21.8% from 45 to 64, and 12.2% was 65 years of age or older. The median age was 35 years. For every 100 females, there were 88.0 males. For every 100 females age 18 and over, there were 81.9 males.

The median income for a household in the city was $48,697, and the median income for a family was $54,786. Males had a median income of $40,922 versus $35,968 for females. The per capita income for the city was $21,677. 9.4% of the population and 7.8% of families were below the poverty line. Out of the total population, 10.9% of those under the age of 18 and 13.9% of those 65 and older were living below the poverty line.

== Education ==
Oak Park's educational history began with the Clinton School, a one-room schoolhouse on property donated by Barney Clinton in the early 20th century. As the population grew rapidly, Clinton School was expanded and more elementary schools were built, particularly beginning in the 1950s.

Clinton School was made a junior high school and another was built in the mid-1960s, then named for the poet Robert Frost. At that time, one school in Oak Park had a special education department for children with learning disabilities: Lessenger Elementary School on Albany St. at Sunset St. Consequently, many families with such special children gravitated to the neighborhood surrounding Lessenger, creating a "cluster" of such families rarely found elsewhere.

Educational achievement was the long consistent pattern in Oak Park. Over 85% of Oak Park High School graduates continued their education immediately after high school, whether in college, or in trade or vocational schools. In the 1950s and 1960s the Oak Park School District was renowned statewide due to the efforts of progressive and dedicated teachers and community support which liberally allocated tax dollars to fund education through voter approved bond issues.

The high school had an average score of 3.8 on the state's MEAP test in 2011. This was one of the lowest scores in Oakland County.

Students residing between 10 Mile Rd. and 11 Mile Rd. are in the Berkley School District. A square mile on the east end of Oak Park is in the neighboring Ferndale Public Schools; the majority of the city is in Oak Park Schools.

== Controversy ==
In July 2011, Oak Park gained national attention when the city charged Julie Bass, a homeowner, for growing vegetables in her front yard.

In March 2015, Stephanie Sumner and Michael Sumner were fired from their positions as city employees after the city had discovered that they had stolen $433,000 from the city over the course of two years. Several months after the story broke, the city announced that the stolen funds had been replaced through the city's insurance policy. However, many residents voiced their concerns regarding the potential insurance rate hikes that would occur after insurance claims to replace the stolen money.

== Notable people ==
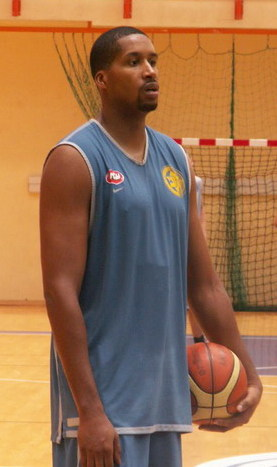
Jamie Arnold

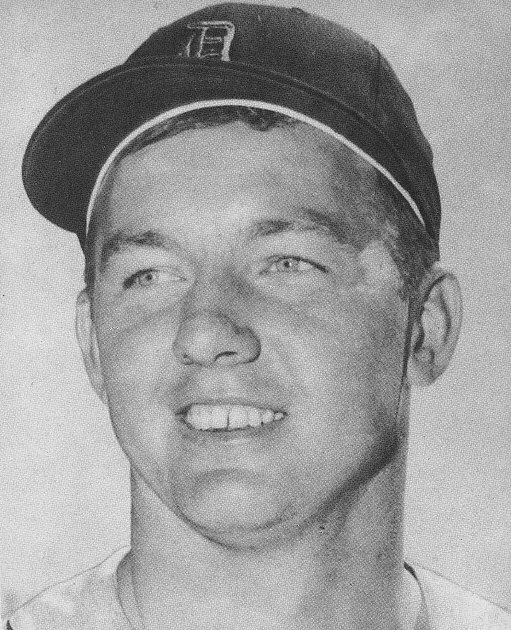
Al Kaline

Peter Werbe

- Jamie Arnold, American-Israeli professional basketball player with Hapoel Holon
- Jeff Bass, record producer; born and raised in Oak Park; brother of Mark Bass
- Mark Bass, record producer; born and raised in Oak Park; brother of Jeff Bass
- Maxine Berman, educator and politician
- Bob Black, anarchist theorist; author of the widely disseminated essay "The Abolition of Work"; grew up in Oak Park and graduated from its high school
- Norm Cash, baseball player for the Detroit Tigers 1960–1974; lived a few blocks from his teammate Al Kaline, on Sloman Street between Jerome and Saratoga
- Vincent Chin, Chinese American victim of a racially motivated killing
- Marcella Detroit, vocalist, guitarist, and songwriter
- Larry Downes, co-author of Unleashing the Killer App: Digital Strategies for Market Dominance; writer for Forbes; was raised in Oak Park
- Robert Ettinger, "father of cryonic human preservation"; lived in Oak Park for decades
- Doug Fieger, musician, lead singer of the group The Knack; his hit songs included "My Sharona" and "Good Girls Don't"
- Geoffrey Fieger, attorney who represented Jack Kevorkian; grew up in Oak Park and graduated from Oak Park High School in 1969
- Ben Forta, prolific tech author; authority on edtech
- Les Gold, owner of American Jewelry and Loan; star of the TV show Hardcore Pawn; lived in Oak Park for several years during his childhood
- Mike Israetel, exercise scientist and bodybuilder
- Al Kaline, Detroit Tiger baseball legend and Hall of Fame member; lived on Morton Street in the late 1950s
- John Kelly, football running back
- Carrie Keranen, voice actress
- Marty Lederman, Deputy Assistant Attorney General in the Department of Justice's Office of Legal Counsel (OLC) during Obama and Biden administrations.
- Stephen Markman, justice of Michigan Supreme Court
- Paul Milgrom, Nobel Prize winning economist
- Dan and Tracee Miller, musicians in the band Blanche; currently reside in Oak Park; Dan has acted in film and Tracee is also a visual artist
- James Rosen, author and political reporter
- Royce da 5'9", Detroit rapper known for his association with Eminem as Bad Meets Evil and Slaughterhouse
- Jeffrey Sachs, noted economist of Harvard University and currently at Columbia University; graduate of Oak Park High School
- Rabbi Berel Shemtov, notable Jewish leader, head Chabad rabbi in the state of Michigan, and the Lubavitcher Rebbe's first emissary in the United States. He is responsible for establishing schools, community centers, and building Jewish infrastructure in the state since 1958
- Jeffrey Seller, Broadway producer and Tony Award winner; known for his work on Rent, Avenue Q, In the Heights and Hamilton
- Shaggy 2 Dope (real name Joseph Utsler), member of Insane Clown Posse; met Violent J in Oak Park
- Curt Sobel, composer, film music editor and supervisor; grew up in Oak Park and lived on Northfield and Harding
- Ron Suresha, author and editor; attended grade school in Oak Park and graduated from OPHS
- Violent J (real name Joseph Bruce), member of Insane Clown Posse; met Shaggy 2 Dope in Oak Park
- David Was (real name David Weiss), musician from the group Was (Not Was); grew up with Don Fagenson in Oak Park
- Don Was (real name Don Fagenson), musician from the group Was (Not Was); grew up with David Weiss in Oak Park
- Peter Werbe, radio talk show host, DJ, and political activist; has lived in Oak Park for 37 years; hosted NightCall on Detroit's WRIF 1970–2016, the longest running phone-in talk show in U.S. radio history; staff member of the magazine The Fifth Estate Author, Summer on Fire: A Detroit Novel 2021.
