= Mike Israetel =

American exercise scientist and bodybuilder (born 1984)

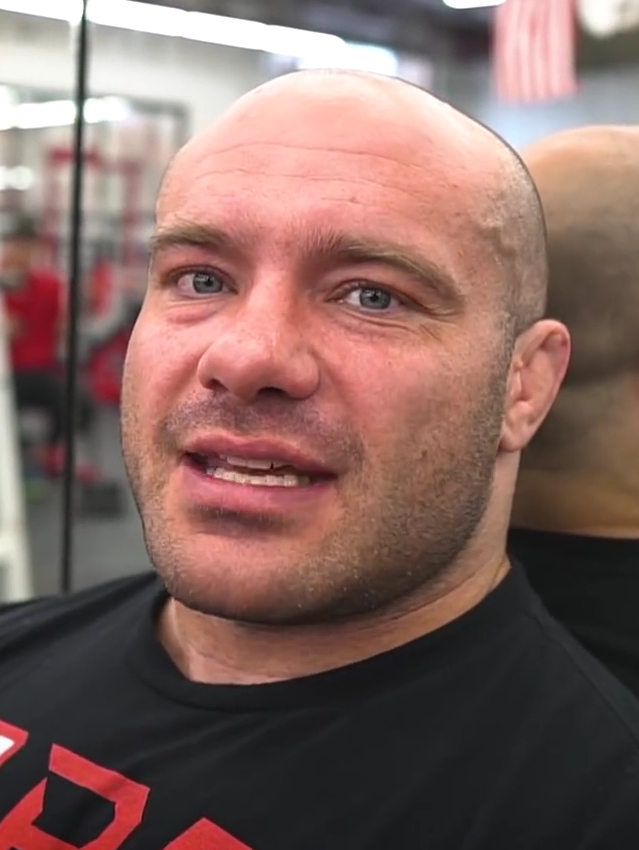
- Israetel in 2020
- Born: Michael Alexandrovich Israetel; May 30, 1984 (age 42); Moscow, Soviet Union
- Education: University of Michigan (BSc); Appalachian State University (MSc); East Tennessee State University (PhD)
- Years active: 2012–present

Instagram information
- Page: Michael Israetel
- Followers: 1.2 million

YouTube information
- Channel: Renaissance Periodization
- Genres: Health; fitness
- Subscribers: 3.89 million
- Last updated: August 27, 2026
- Website: rpstrength.com

Michael Alexandrovich Israetel (born May 30, 1984) is an American exercise scientist and bodybuilder. He holds a PhD in sports physiology and is known for his advocacy against the use of PEDs in sports. He is also a founder of the company Renaissance Periodization, which provides science-based resources and coaching for strength training.

== Early life ==
Michael Alexandrovich Israetel was born on May 30, 1984, in Moscow, Russia. He is an Ashkenazi Jew. His family moved to Oak Park, Michigan, when he was seven to seek better opportunities. He began lifting in high school to get stronger for wrestling and, while an undergraduate at the School of Kinesiology of the University of Michigan, a martial arts mentor convinced him to start powerlifting. Israetel competed professionally until 2007 and then began bodybuilding after reading magazines about the sport; he did his first show in 2013.

Israetel received his master's in exercise science from Appalachian State University and worked in New York City as a personal trainer until leaving in 2010 to finish his PhD in sport physiology at East Tennessee State University in 2013. While at ETSU, he was the sports nutrition consultant for the university's Olympic Training Site.

== Career ==
After receiving his PhD, Israetel had worked as an assistant professor of exercise science at the University of Central Missouri, an exercise and sport science professor at the College of Public Health at Temple University, and a human performance and fitness professor at Lehman College. In 2012, he founded Renaissance Periodization alongside Nick Shaw, whom he had met at the University of Michigan. While both working as personal trainers, they referred to each other so often that they decided to incorporate themselves into a company. The name of the company comes from the growth of science during the Renaissance and the hedge fund Renaissance Technologies, which uses quantitative analysis in trading.

In December 2024, Israetel was promoted to a BJJ black belt. In March 2025, he and Giacomo Zacchia founded Genius Shot, a protein drink company. In September, law student Solomon Nelson released a video criticizing Israetel's doctorate dissertation, which contained numerous errors in its mechanics and methodology. Israetel claimed that he had accidentally uploaded the wrong draft of the doctorate to the university and that he had another, earlier draft and was unsure which was the final version. He also released an updated version with the correction of the errors Nelson listed and removed access to the file on the university's website to non-students. Israetel later revealed that Nelson had originally reviewed the correct version of the dissertation.
