= Royal Oak Charter Township, Michigan =

Royal Oak Township, Michigan
- Charter township
- Charter Township of Royal Oak
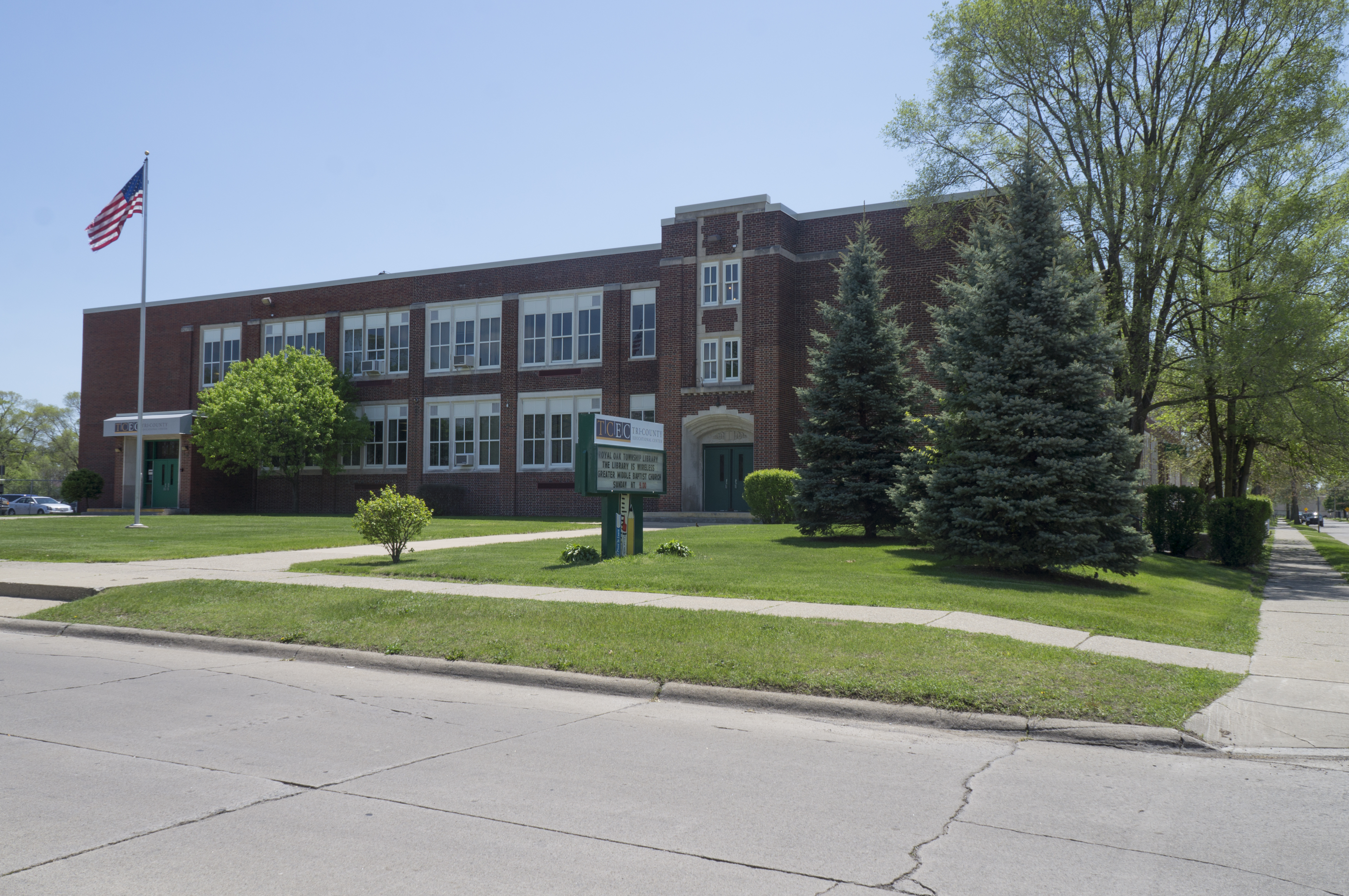
- Royal Oak Township Administrative Offices

- Seal

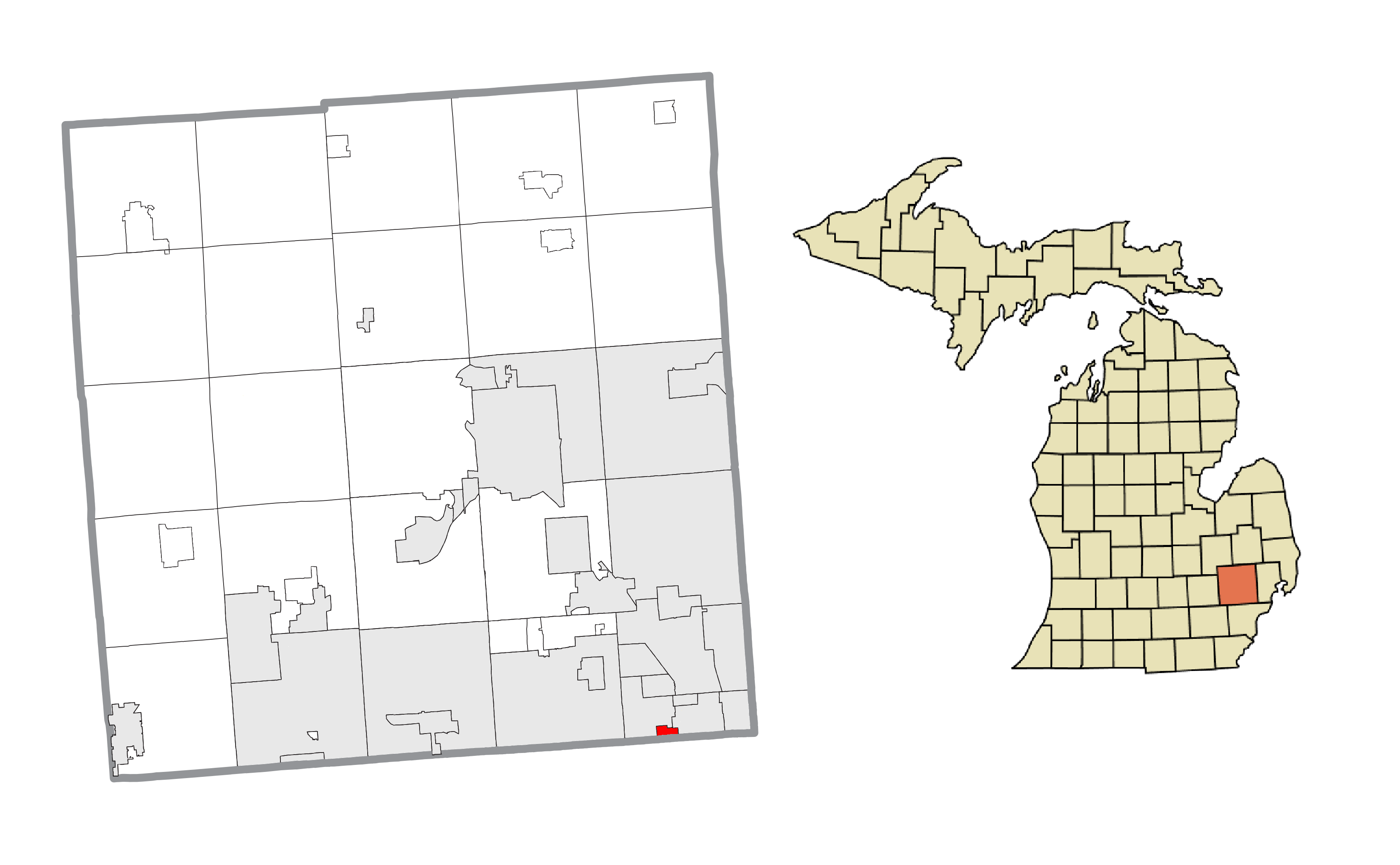
- Location within Oakland County

- Location within the state of Michigan Location within the United States
- Coordinates: 42°27′11″N 83°10′13″W
- Country: United States
- State: Michigan
- County: Oakland
- Established: 1833
- Chartered: 1972

Government
  - Supervisor: Donna Squalls
  - Clerk: Gwendolyn Turner

Area
  - Total: 0.55 sq mi (1.42 km^{2})
  - Land: 0.55 sq mi (1.42 km^{2})
  - Water: 0 sq mi (0.0 km^{2})
- Elevation: 659 ft (201 m)

Population (2020)
  - Total: 2,374
  - Density: 4,330/sq mi (1,670/km^{2})
- Time zone: UTC-5 (EST)
  - Summer (DST): UTC-4 (EDT)
- ZIP Code(s): 48220 (Ferndale)
- Area code: 248
- FIPS code: 26-70060
- GNIS feature ID: 1627012
- Website: Official website

Royal Oak Township is a charter township in Oakland County in the U.S. state of Michigan. An inner-ring suburb of Detroit, Royal Oak Township borders Detroit to the north, roughly 11 miles (17.7 km) north of downtown Detroit. As of the 2020 census, the township had a population of 2,374. It is separate from, and independent of, the city of Royal Oak.

The township is the only remaining unincorporated portion of the original 36-square-mile (93.2 km^{2}) Royal Oak survey township, which was organized in 1833. With an area of 0.55 square miles (1.42 km^{2}) since 2004, Royal Oak Charter Township is the state's smallest charter township by area and the second-smallest overall township in the state after Novi Township.

== History ==
Royal Oak Township was established in 1833 as a regular, 36-square-mile (93 km^{2}) civil township, and at one time consisted of all or parts of the following modern cities: Hazel Park, Ferndale, Oak Park, Madison Heights, Pleasant Ridge, Huntington Woods, Royal Oak, Berkley, and Clawson. The township began to shrink beginning in 1921 with the incorporation of the cities above. To provide greater protection from easy annexation, the township incorporated as a charter township in 1972. Currently, the township has neither its own police department nor a post office. Its police department was disbanded in 1998.

=== 2003 and 2004 annexations ===
From the incorporation of Madison Heights in 1955 to 2004, the township consisted of two small non-contiguous parts within Oakland County. The larger portion lies along Eight Mile Road, adjacent to the cities of Detroit, Oak Park, and Ferndale. A second portion, located to the northwest and bordering Oak Park and Southfield, was the subject of a series of annexations and conditional land transfers in 2003 and 2004

Two property-initiated annexation elections in 2003 consisted of Crown Pointe Plaza office complex, Lincoln Towers Apartments, Biarritz Club/Rue Versailles Apartments, in which the township was estimated to have lost 20% of its property tax value to Oak Park. The property owners cited lower taxes in the city of Oak Park and poor relations with the township's government as reasons for seeking annexation. Two additional property owners initiated an annexation to Oak Park in 2004, which involved the annexation of the Bridgewater Village Apartments and Lincoln Woods Apartments.

Lawsuits were filed by the township seeking to overturn these annexations; to make the transfer of the territory to the city more amicable and to end litigation, Oak Park initiated talks with the township on a 425 Agreement in September 2004, which allows the transfer of territory conditioned on the sharing of taxes generated from the transferred territory. The 425 agreement, which was to run 35 years and covered all previously annexed areas of the township—except Bridgewater Village Apartments—plus the remaining unannexed areas of the township, was agreed upon by the city and township in October. It came into effect on November 1, 2004, the day preceding the election to annex Bridgewater Village and Lincoln Woods Apartments, fully completing the transfer of the northwest part of the township to Oak Park, and ending litigation from the township against the city. Oak Park amended the 425 Agreement on January 16, 2006, to bring in Bridgewater Village Apartments after resolving litigiation with the property owner concerning taxes and the associated costs of annexation.

== Geography ==
According to the United States Census Bureau, the township has a total area of 0.55 square miles (1.42 km^{2}), all land.

== Demographics ==
Historical population
Census	Pop.	Note	%±
1920	15,432		—
1930	26,277		70.3%
1940	24,958		−5.0%
1950	10,508		−57.9%
1960	8,147		−22.5%
1970	6,326		−22.4%
1980	5,784		−8.6%
1990	5,006		−13.5%
2000	5,446		8.8%
2010	2,419		−55.6%
2020	2,374		−1.9%
U.S. Decennial Census; 2010 2020

=== Racial and ethnic composition ===
Royal Oak Charter Township, Michigan – Racial and ethnic composition Note: the US Census treats Hispanic/Latino as an ethnic category. This table excludes Latinos from the racial categories and assigns them to a separate category. Hispanics/Latinos may be of any race.
Race / Ethnicity (NH = Non-Hispanic)	Pop 2000	Pop 2010	Pop 2020	% 2000	% 2010	% 2020
White alone (NH)	1,232	30	115	22.62%	1.24%	4.84%
Black or African American alone (NH)	3,870	2,284	2,110	71.06%	94.42%	88.88%
Native American or Alaska Native alone (NH)	11	3	0	0.20%	0.12%	0.00%
Asian alone (NH)	66	1	9	1.21%	0.04%	0.38%
Native Hawaiian or Pacific Islander alone (NH)	2	1	0	0.04%	0.04%	0.00%
Other race alone (NH)	30	6	28	0.55%	0.25%	1.18%
Mixed race or Multiracial (NH)	172	63	73	3.16%	2.60%	3.07%
Hispanic or Latino (any race)	63	31	39	1.16%	1.28%	1.64%
Total	5,446	2,419	2,374	100.00%	100.00%	100.00%

=== 2020 census ===
As of the 2020 census, there were 2,374 people living in the township. The population density was 4,316.3 inhabitants per square mile (1,666.5/km^{2}). 1,106 housing units at an average density of 2,010 per square mile (780/km^{2}). The racial makeup of the township (including Hispanics) was 5.0% White, 89.7% African American, 0.0% Native American, 0.0% Asian, 0.0% Pacific Islander, 1.3% from other races, and 3.3% from two or more races. Hispanic or Latino of any race were 1.6% of the population.

=== 2010 census ===
As of the census of 2010, there were 2,419 people living in the township. The population density was 4,398.1 inhabitants per square mile (1,698.1/km^{2}). There were 1,111 housing units at an average density of 2,020.0 per square mile (779.9/km^{2}). The racial makeup of the township was 1.4% White, 95.3% African American, 0.1% Native American, 0.0% Asian, 0.0% Pacific Islander, 0.3% from other races, and 2.8% from two or more races. Hispanic or Latino of any race were 1.3% of the population.

=== 2000 census ===
There were 1,211 households, out of which 25.2% had children under the age of 18 living with them, 21.1% were married couples living together, 26.7% had a female householder with no husband present, and 48.5% were non-families. 44.1% of all households were made up of individuals, and 17.2% had someone living alone who was 65 years of age or older. The average household size was 2.15 and the average family size was 3.02.

In the township the population was spread out, with 25.0% under the age of 18, 10.1% from 18 to 24, 29.7% from 25 to 44, 18.3% from 45 to 64, and 16.9% who were 65 years of age or older. The median age was 34 years. For every 100 females, there were 78.6 males. For every 100 females age 18 and over, there were 72.2 males.

The median income for a household in the township was $23,710, and the median income for a family was $28,397. Males had a median income of $28,824 versus $26,382 for females. The per capita income for the township was $15,027. About 19.9% of families and 23.5% of the population were below the poverty line, including 25.8% of those under age 18 and 30.4% of those age 65 and over.

== Government ==
A charter township, it is governed by a popularly elected 7-member board of trustees, which includes a township supervisor, clerk and treasurer as its administrative officers.

For public safety, the township contracts with the Michigan State Police for police services and the Ferndale Fire Department for fire services. For postal purposes, the community records its location as "Ferndale, MI 48220".

== Education ==
The township is divided between Oak Park School District and Ferndale Public Schools.

The Clinton School District previously served Royal Oak Township. The majority black George Washington Carver School District separated from the Clinton district in 1945 as more African-Americans moved to the area. In 1960, Governor of Michigan G. Mennen Williams consolidated the Carver School District, along with its elementary school, into the Oak Park School District because the Carver district no longer had sufficient taxes to pay for senior high school services, and no area school districts voluntarily took its students for high school.

== Economy ==
At the northernmost point of the township lies Radio Plaza, bordered by Radio Plaza Street on the west, which serves as home to Beasley Broadcast Group, and Salem Media Group's Detroit market headquarters, as well as Beasley subsidiary Motower Multilink Corporation's 993-foot radio tower. WCSX, WDVD, and WMGC transmit from Radio Plaza. WRIF is based at Radio Plaza but transmits from the TV 7 tower on West Ten Mile near the Lodge freeway. Salem's AM stations WDTK and WLQV are based at Radio Plaza but use separate transmitters located near the cities of Highland Park and Lincoln Park respectively.

== Highways ==
- M-102 (8 Mile Road) runs east–west as the southern border of the township with the city of Detroit.

== Images ==
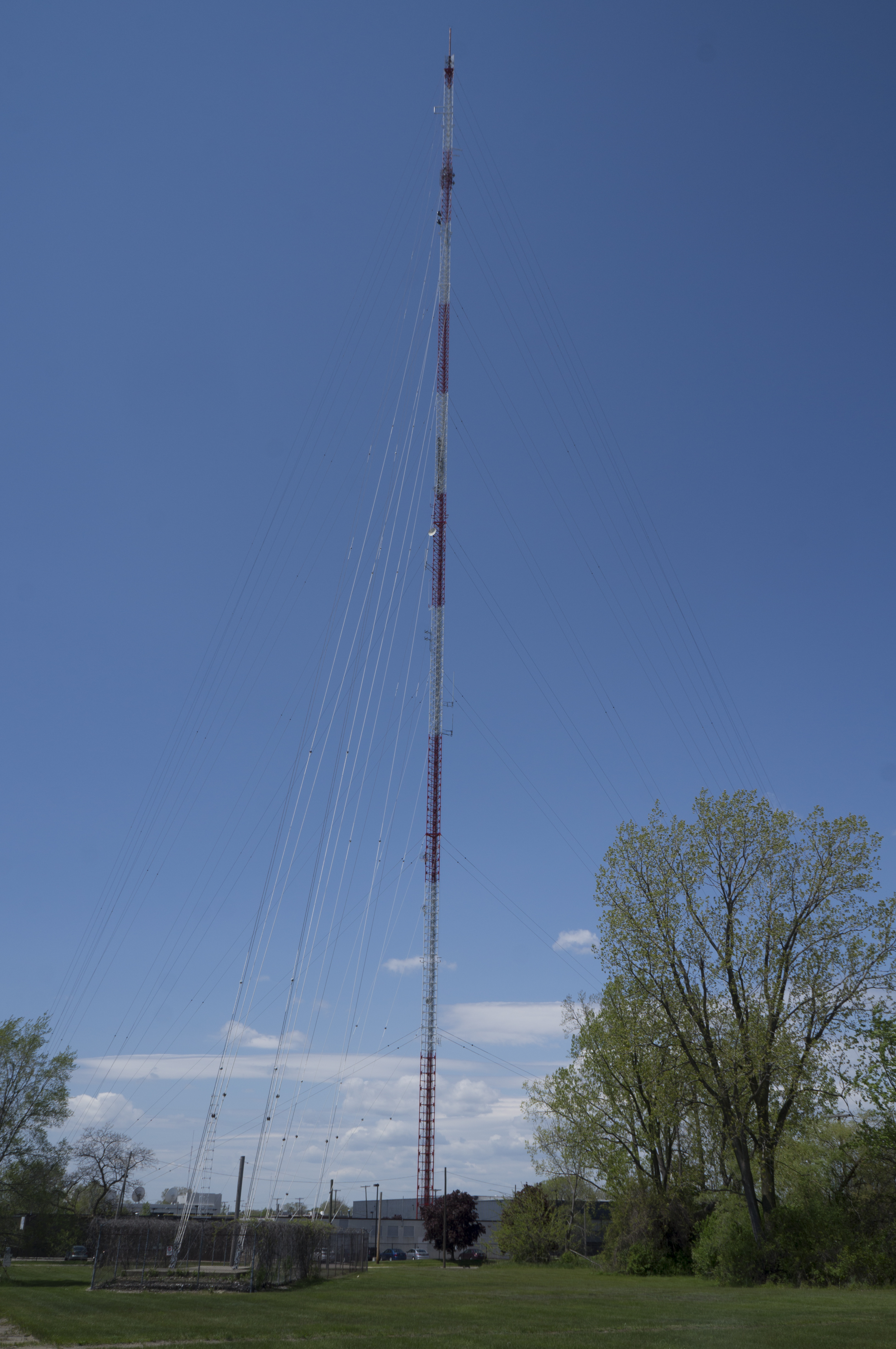
Motower Multilink Corporation's radio tower in Radio Plaza

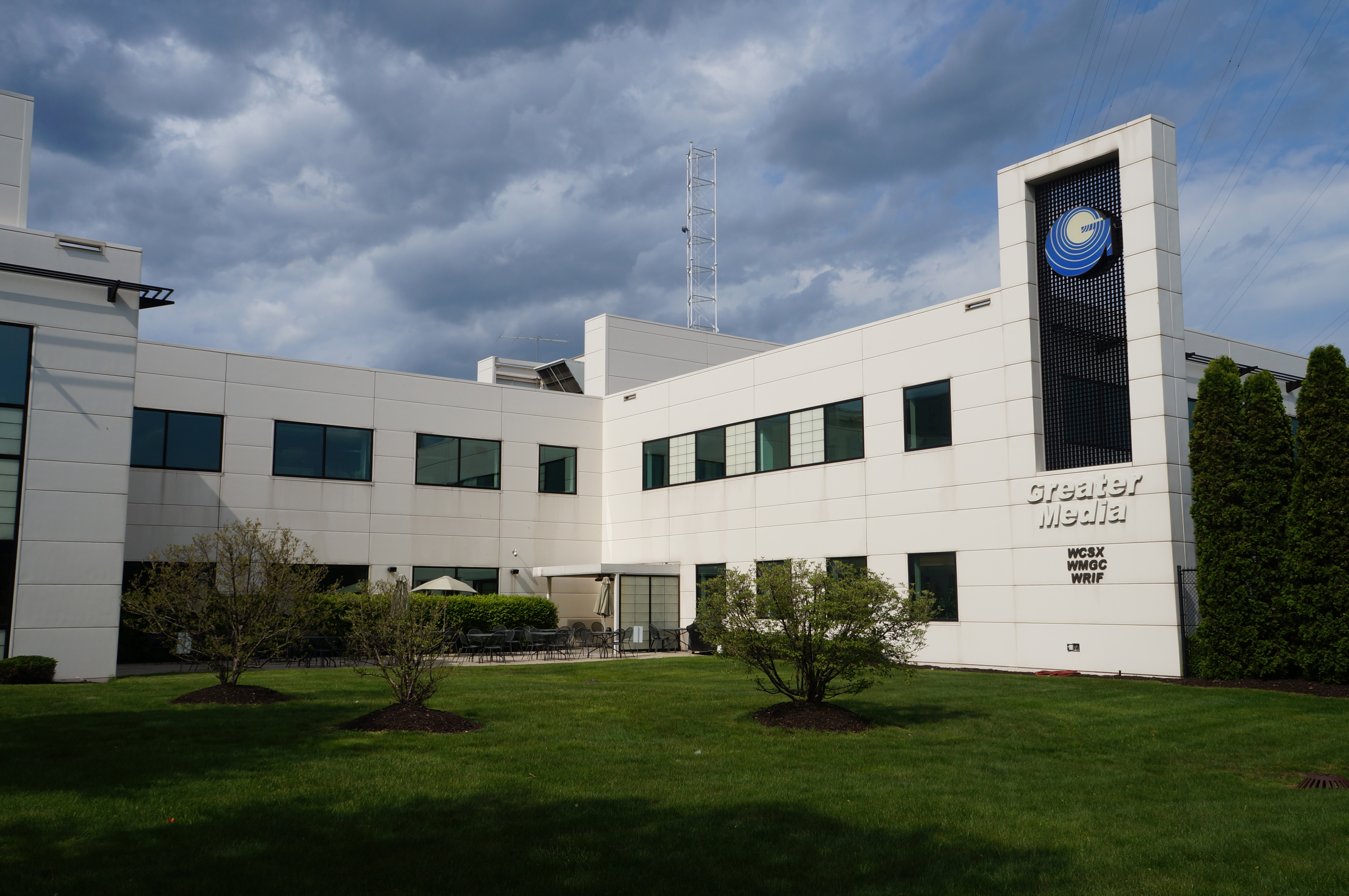
Greater Media's Detroit complex, home to WCSX, WMGC, and WRIF prior to its purchase by Beasley Broadcast Group

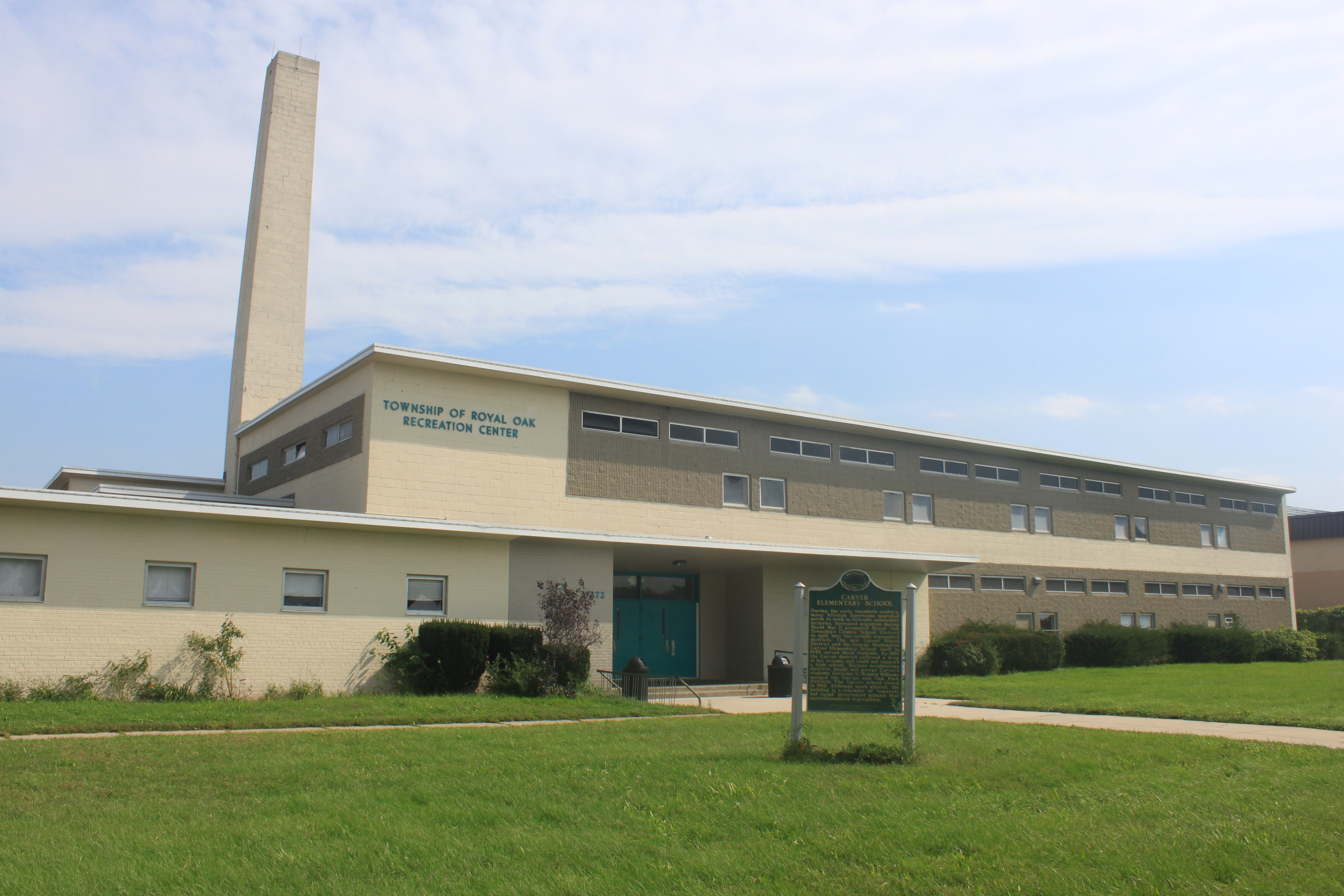
Carver Elementary School, a Michigan State Historic Site and current recreational center

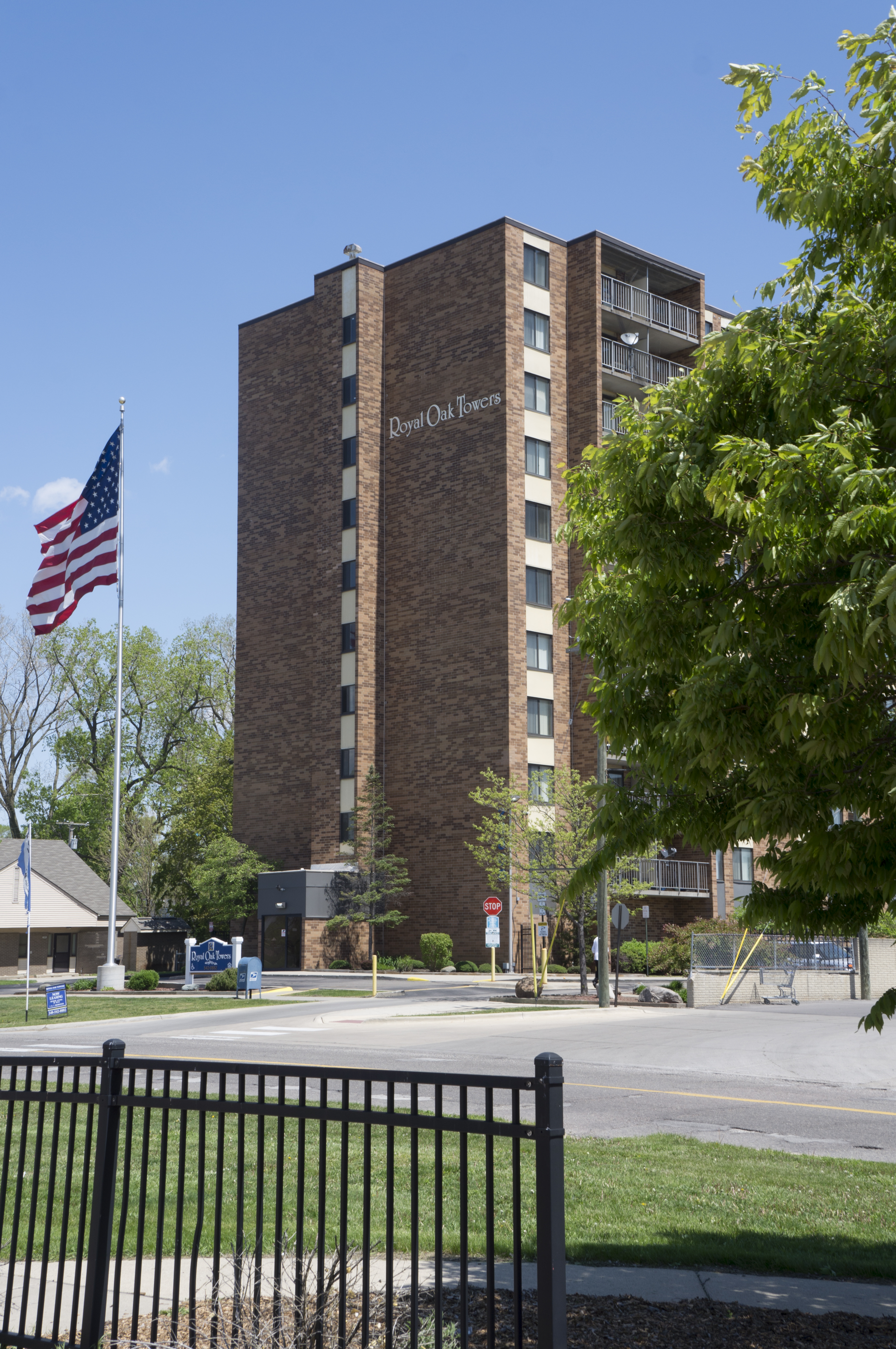
Royal Oak Towers senior citizens apartment tower
