= Ferndale High School (Michigan) =

High school in Ferndale, Oakland County, Michigan

Location
- 881 Pinecrest Drive; Ferndale, Michigan 48220; United States; 42°27′10″N 83°08′54″W

Information
- Type: Public high school
- School district: Ferndale Public Schools
- Principal: Michael Griffin
- Teaching staff: 42.50 (FTE)
- Enrollment: 739 (2024–2025)
- Student to teacher ratio: 17.39
- Colors: Brown, white and gold
- Athletics conference: Oakland Activities Association
- Nickname: Eagles
- Accreditation: North Central Association of Colleges and Schools
- Website: www.ferndaleschools.org/o/fhs

Student assessments
- 2021–22 school year Change vs. prior year

M-STEP 11th grade proficiency rates (Science / Social Studies)
- Advanced %: 14.6 / 9.2
- Proficient %: 19.5 / 22.7
- PR. Proficient %: 14.6 / 52.1
- Not Proficient %: 51.2 / 16.0

Average test scores
- SAT Total: 918.5 (▼ −81.5)

Ferndale High School is a public high school in Ferndale, Michigan. It is under the jurisdiction of the Ferndale Public Schools.

== History ==
Ferndale Central School was the first building to include the city's high school. Its first graduating class was in 1918.

Lincoln High School, the predecessor of Ferndale High School, opened in 1921 on the corner of 9 Mile and Livernois Roads. Despite several additions, it had a 1,500 student capacity and could not handle the enrollment of 2,081 seen in 1958. Classes were held in all corners of the building, even basement custodial rooms. The cafeteria was so crowded that some students gave up on lunch. During the 1946–47 season in the National Basketball League, the Detroit Gems used Ferndale High School as one of their home venues alongside the Holy Redeemer High School Gymnasium and the Detroit Olympia (when playing in doubleheader matches alongside the Detroit Falcons of the newly created Basketball Association of America) in their only season as a team.

On November 21, 1955, property owners in the district approved a $6.5 million bond issue to build a new high school. Dearborn architecture firm Jahr, Anderson, Machida presented plans in January 1957, and construction began later that year. The building was designed for a capacity of 2,850 students and originally had 106 classrooms and separate male and female pools. Classrooms opened in November 1958 with full completion of the building in 1959.

With the opening of Ferndale High, Lincoln became a junior high school.Lincoln Junior High housed grades 7 and 8 until it closed in 1976.

As part of the district's 1995 bond issue, the high school media center was expanded and rebuilt with a wall of windows looking over the courtyard. The new space opened in 1998.

Following a district restructuring, middle school grades joined the high school building in fall 2002. The schools maintain their own identities within the same building.

== Athletics ==
The Ferndale Eagles are a member of the Oakland Activities Association. The school colors are currently brown, white and gold. The following MHSAA sanctioned sports are offered:

- Baseball (boys)
- Basketball (boys & girls)
  - Boys state champions - 1963, 1966, 2023
- Bowling (boys & girls)
- Cheerleading (girls)
- Cross country (boys & girls)
- Dance (girls)
- Football (boys)
- Golf (boys)
- Soccer (boys & girls)
- Softball (girls)
- Swimming (boys & girls)
- Tennis (boys & girls)
- Track & field (boys & girls)
- Volleyball (girls)
- Wrestling (boys)

== Notable people ==
- Bethany Ball, author
- James Blanchard, governor of Michigan 1983–1991
- Anne Harris, professor and science fiction author
- Frank Joranko, football and baseball player and coach; FHS coach 1960–1972
- David Kemper, television writer and producer
- Paigion (Kimberly Walker), host of BET's 106 & Park (2012–present)
- Rashad Phillips, former professional basketball player
- Miriam Shor, film and television actress
- Bobby Smith, R&B singer, principal lead singer of the classic Motown/Philly group The Spinners
