= WeatherGard =

Michigan manufacturer

WeatherGard Window Company
- Company type: Private
- Industry: Fenestration
- Founded: 1988, in Detroit, Michigan
- Founder: Albert BenEzra
- Headquarters: Farmington, Michigan, United States
- Number of locations: 3 (2015)
- Area served: Lower Peninsula of Michigan, United States
- Key people: Shlome BenEzra
- Products: Windows
- Services: Windows doors insulation roofing siding gutters
- Number of employees: 150 (2015)
- Website: weathergard.com

WeatherGard is a Farmington, Michigan -based window manufacturer that provides custom window, door, insulation, roofing, gutter, and siding installation services to customers in Michigan's Lower Peninsula.The company operates from its offices in Farmington and Grand Rapids.

== History ==
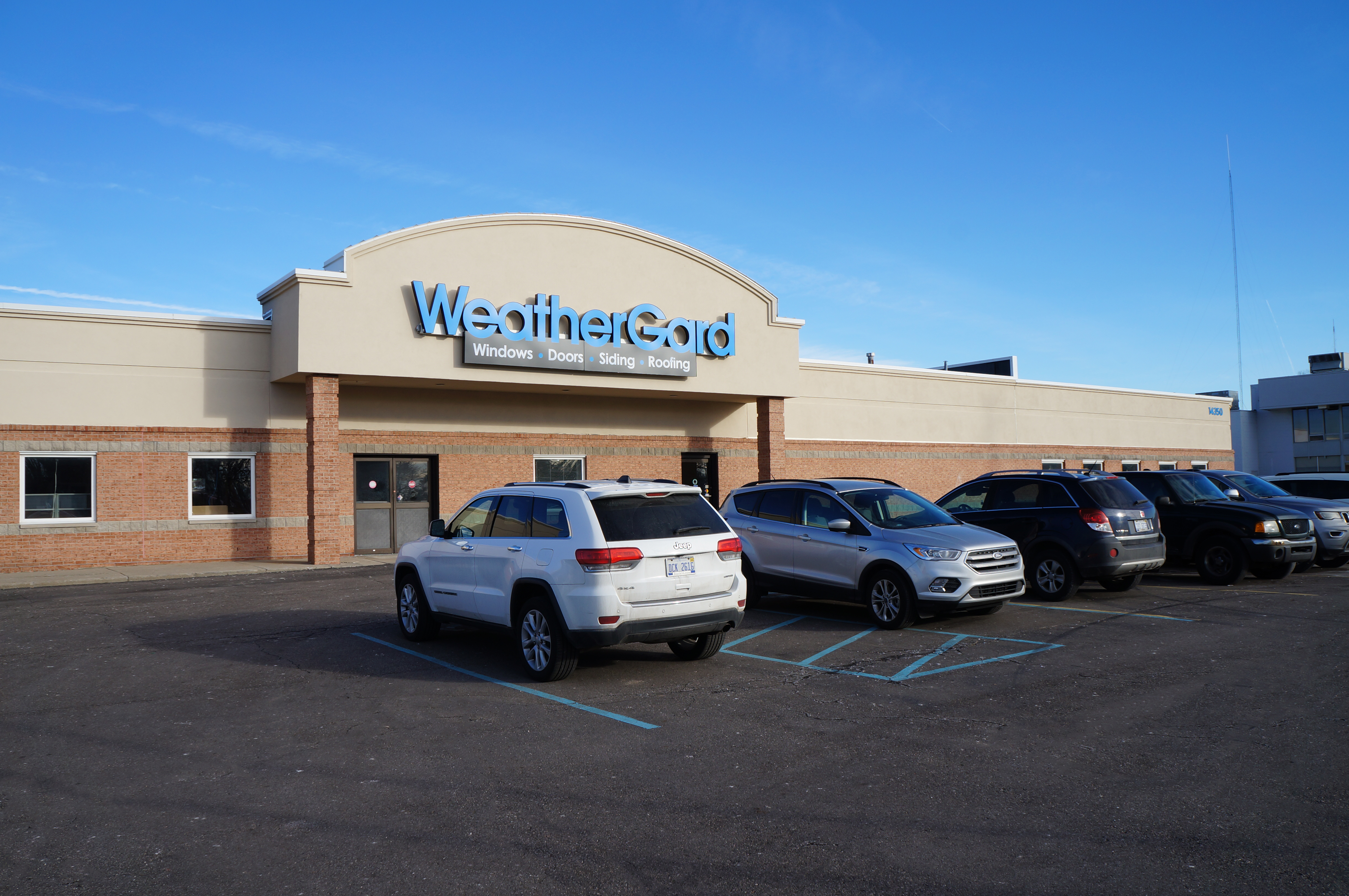
WeatherGard's former factory and headquarters in Oak Park

WeatherGard was founded as WeatherGard Window Company, Inc. by Albert BenEzra on September 13, 1988, in Detroit, Michigan. BenEzra, who had been in the door industry for over a decade, realized he could expand his business by manufacturing windows. Basing his design on British manufacturing techniques, WeatherGard became the first window manufacturer in Michigan to introduce four-point welding, and the first to offer painted exterior colors. WeatherGard later expanded its operations, moving its location to Oak Park in 1995. It was there that they introduced insulation, roofing, gutter, and siding installation services. In 2021, WeatherGard relocated to Farmington to their new 92,000 square foot facility. WeatherGard is the largest private manufacturer in Farmington, Michigan. The company primarily focuses on residential services, but has also taken part in commercial work, such as the restoration of the historic Alden Park Towers in Detroit.

== Awards ==
In 2015 WeatherGard received an Excellence in Energy Efficiency Award from Consumers Energy.
