= AutoWeb =

American automotive marketing services company

AutoWeb, Inc.
- Type: Private
- Industry: Automotive marketing services
- Founded: 1995; 31 years ago
- Founder: Peter R. Ellis; John C. Bedrosian
- Headquarters: Walnut Creek, California, U.S.
- Key people: Payam Zamani and Frank Zamani the co-founders of the original AutoWeb
- Net income: $1.387 Million (2012)
- Parent: One Planet Group
- Website: AutoWeb.com

AutoWeb, Inc. is a privately held automotive media and marketing services company that provides media and customers acquisition solutions to automotive manufacturers and dealerships in the United States.

Headquartered in Irvine, California, the company specializes in online lead generation, pay-per-click advertising, and email marketing. AutoWeb originated from two separate companies, Auto-by-Tel founded in 1995, and the original AutoWeb.com, founded in 1994, which later merged.

After a series of rebrandings and acquisitions, the company adopted the AutoWeb name in 2017. In 2022, AutoWeb was acquired by One Planet Group and returned to private ownership under co-founder Payam Zamani.

== History ==
=== Founding and early development (1994–2000) ===
AutoWeb was founded in 1994 by brothers Payam and Frank Zamani as AutoWeb.com, an early automotive website designed to connect car buyers with dealerships online. The company went public on March 23, 1999, listing on Nasdaq under the symbol ABTL.

In 1995, John Bedrosian and Peter Ellis founded Auto-by-Tel LLC. Bedrosian was one of the co-founders of National Medical Enterprises, and Ellis was a car dealership owner in Southern California who became well known in the 1980s for his prevalent television advertisements. Auto-by-Tel was originally a syllabic abbreviation for Automobiles-by-Telephone but later became an abbreviation for Automobiles-by-Telecommunication, in order to incorporate the Internet into its name.

Auto-by-Tel was the first Internet company to advertise during the Super Bowl in 1997. The company went public on March 26, 1999.

=== Rebranding and acquisitions (2001–2010) ===
In 2001, Auto-by-Tel LLC officially changed its name to Autobytel Inc. and acquired Autoweb.com.

On November 15, 2004, Autobytel announced it would restate financial results for the second, third, and fourth quarters of 2003, the full 2003 fiscal year and the first and second quarters of 2004, due to its accounting problems covering a number of issues that surfaced after the disclosure of a review by its audit committee. After further review, on March 15, 2005, the company announced it also expected to restate its financial statements for the full 2002 fiscal year and the first fiscal quarter of 2003. This led to the filing of a class action lawsuit against Autobytel alleging that it violated Securities Exchange Act by disseminating false statements and inflating its financial results.

On April 25, 2007, Autobytel was named one of California's 15 best technology innovators at the California Innovation Awards.

The 2008 financial crisis forced the company to reduce costs primarily by laying off a big portion of the workforce. It also considered selling itself, but that plan was tabled in 2009. The FY2012 results showed a small profit, suggesting the layoff strategy worked at keeping the business running until the economy recovered.

=== Revival and digital expansions (2013–2017) ===
In late 2013, Autobytel purchased a portion of AutoWeb, a pay-per-click advertising network for automotive manufacturers and dealers. During 2013 in Miami, Florida, Jose Vargas, Matias de Tezanos, and Julio Gonzalez-Arrivillaga launched a new startup and called it AutoWeb. Later that year, Autobytel acquired a $2.5 million stake in AutoWeb. Before Autobytel's suggestion of the name AutoWeb, the startup's founders planned to call the company AdTarget. Autobytel had suggested the name from the company it had acquired in 2001. On October 1, 2015, Autobytel fully acquired AutoWeb, Inc., in an all-stock and warrant transaction.

In October 2017, Autobytel Inc. changed its name to AutoWeb, Inc. and changed its ticker from ABTL to AUTO.

=== Recent developments (2018–present) ===
During the COVID-19 pandemic, AutoWeb received $1.4 million in federally backed small business loans as part of the Paycheck Protection Program. The company received scrutiny over this loan, which was aimed at small businesses. The New York Times noted their CEO's pay during 2019 was a reported $1.7 million.

In 2022, AutoWeb was acquired by One Planet Group LLC, a firm led by its original cofounder Payam Zamani. Following the acquisition, AutoWeb was taken private, with Zamani assuming the roles of President and CEO. The transaction followed public disclosures that raised concerns about the company's ongoing financial viability.

== Services ==
Through AutoWeb's marketing network, the company provides both automotive dealers and manufacturers with brand and product marketing opportunities.

AutoWeb offers automotive dealers tools to manage their businesses. Specific products include: the Rapid Response program, designed to connect dealers to online customers via phone, as well as the Email Manager program, which manages long-term email campaigns on behalf of the dealership. Additionally, LeadCall, a live call program that sets in-dealership appointments and scores customer readiness to buy for auto dealers.
