= Oak Park High School (Michigan) =

High school in Michigan, United States

Location
- 13701 Oak Park Boulevard; Oak Park, Michigan; United States; 42.4649°N 83.1838°W

Information
- Type: Public high school
- Motto: We enter to learn, we leave to achieve
- Established: 1954
- School district: Oak Park Schools
- Principal: Carissa Peterson
- Teaching staff: 44.60 (FTE)
- Grades: 9 to 12
- Enrollment: 973 (2023–2024)
- Student to teacher ratio: 19.57
- Colors: Red, black, and white
- Athletics conference: Oakland Activities Association
- Mascot: Oak Park Knights
- Nobel laureates: Paul Milgrom
- Website: www.oakparkschools.org/schools/ophs

Student assessments
- 2021–22 school year Change vs. prior year

M-STEP 11th grade proficiency rates (Science / Social Studies)
- Advanced %: ≤5 / ≤5
- Proficient %: – / –
- PR. Proficient %: 7.6 / 57.6
- Not Proficient %: 83.0 / 30.2

Average test scores
- SAT Total: 778.2 (▼ −27.8)

Oak Park High School is a public high school located in Oak Park, Michigan, United States, an inner suburb of Detroit. The school is part of the Oak Park School district. It serves about 1,130 students in grades 9 to 12 from Oak Park and surrounding communities around Detroit.

In 2010, as a part of the Federal School Improvement Framework, the school was identified by the State of Michigan as one of 92 schools with the lowest achieving, according to performance on Michigan standardized tests. Eligible schools were invited to apply for a grant of up to $6 million over three years to support efforts to raise academic achievement.

Oak Park High School's grant application was awarded $4.2 million. The school was one of 28 schools that were awarded grant funds.

The school colors are red, black, and white. The school mascot is the Oak Park Knights.

== Oak Park High School Athletic Hall of Fame ==
- Coached by Alvin Delidow, Oak Park High School won the Class-A team championship trophy at the 1972 Michigan High School Athletic Association boys' track and field finals. At those same finals, Tony Craighead, Henry Staton, Adolph Mongo, and Mike Rollins brought home gold for the 440-yard relay.
- At the 2010 MHSAA girls' track and field finals, Dissa Swint-Cook won the 200-meter dash, becoming Oak Park High School's first individual state champion in nearly 30 years.
- At the 1982 MHSAA girls' track and field finals, Bernard Wells became the first coach to win a team championship. Team captains Michele "Mimi" Morris and VeronCia "VC" Daffin led the way to this victory.
- In 1984, Oak Park won the MHSAA Class-B boys' basketball championship with a 62–54 victory over Saginaw-Buena Vista High School.

== Notable alumni ==
- Jamie Arnold – retired American-Israeli professional basketball player
- Skilla Baby – rapper
- Edwin Baker – NFL running back
- Rayshaun Benny – college football defensive tackle for the Michigan Wolverines
- Bass Brothers – music producers who helped Eminem start his career
- Vincent Chin – industrial draftsman and murder victim
- Marcella Detroit – vocalist, guitarist, and songwriter – Shakespears Sister
- Larry Downes – author
- Doug Fieger – singer-songwriter-musician – The Knack
- Les Gold – founder of American Jewelry and Loan; star of Hardcore Pawn
- John Kelly – American football running back
- Andrew Lippa – composer
- D'Wan Mathis – college football wide receiver for the Delaware State
- Paul Milgrom – Nobel Prize-winning economist
- Justin Rogers – college football defensive tackle for the Auburn Tigers
- Jeffrey Sachs – economist and director of the Earth Institute at Columbia University
- Bruce Seid – Major League Baseball scout and executive
- Jeffrey Seller – producer of Rent and Hamilton
- Ron Suresha – author and editor
- Don Was – musician, bassist, and record producer – Was (Not Was)
