= WDKL =

K-Love radio station in Mount Clemens, Michigan

- Mount Clemens, Michigan; United States
- Broadcast area: Metro Detroit
- Frequency: 102.7 MHz (HD Radio)
- Branding: K-Love

Programming
- Format: Contemporary Christian
- Subchannels: HD2: Air1; HD3: K-Love 2000s
- Network: K-Love

Ownership
- Owner: Educational Media Foundation

History
- First air date: November 6, 1960
- Former call signs: WBRB-FM (1960–1979); WLBS (1979–1984); WKSG (1984–1991); WXCD (1991–1992); WDZR (1992–1996); WWBR (1996–1999); WDMK (1999–2005); WHTD (2005–2011); WPZR (2011–2018)
- Call sign meaning: "Detroit K-Love"

Technical information
- Licensing authority: FCC
- Facility ID: 54915
- Class: B
- ERP: 36,000 watts
- HAAT: 174 meters (571 ft)
- Transmitter coordinates: 42°28′16″N 83°12′01″W
- Translators: 98.3 W252CP (Holly); HD2: 105.5 W288BK (Rochester Hills); HD2: 106.3 W292DK (Westland); HD2: 107.1 W296CG (Detroit)

Links
- Public license information: Public file; LMS
- Webcast: Listen live Listen live (HD2); Listen live (HD3)
- Website: www.klove.com

WDKL (102.7 FM, K-Love) is a contemporary Christian formatted radio station licensed to Mount Clemens, Michigan, and serving the Detroit metropolitan area. The station is owned by Educational Media Foundation. The station broadcasts with 36,000 watts of power from an antenna located on a tower near Greenfield and 10 Mile Roads in Southfield. The signal is directed more toward the north and east, less toward the south and west, to protect WWWW-FM in Ann Arbor. This tower is shared with WDMK and WUFL.

The transmitter had long been on a tower northeast of the intersection of Gratiot Avenue and Fourteen Mile Road in Clinton Charter Township, Macomb County, Michigan. WDKL still maintains a low powered auxiliary transmitter and antenna on this tower, to maintain normal coverage in Mount Clemens, its city of license in case issues arise at the Southfield facility.

WDKL is licensed for HD Radio service, carrying Air1 and K-Love 2000s on its subchannels.

== History ==
=== WBRB-AM-FM ===
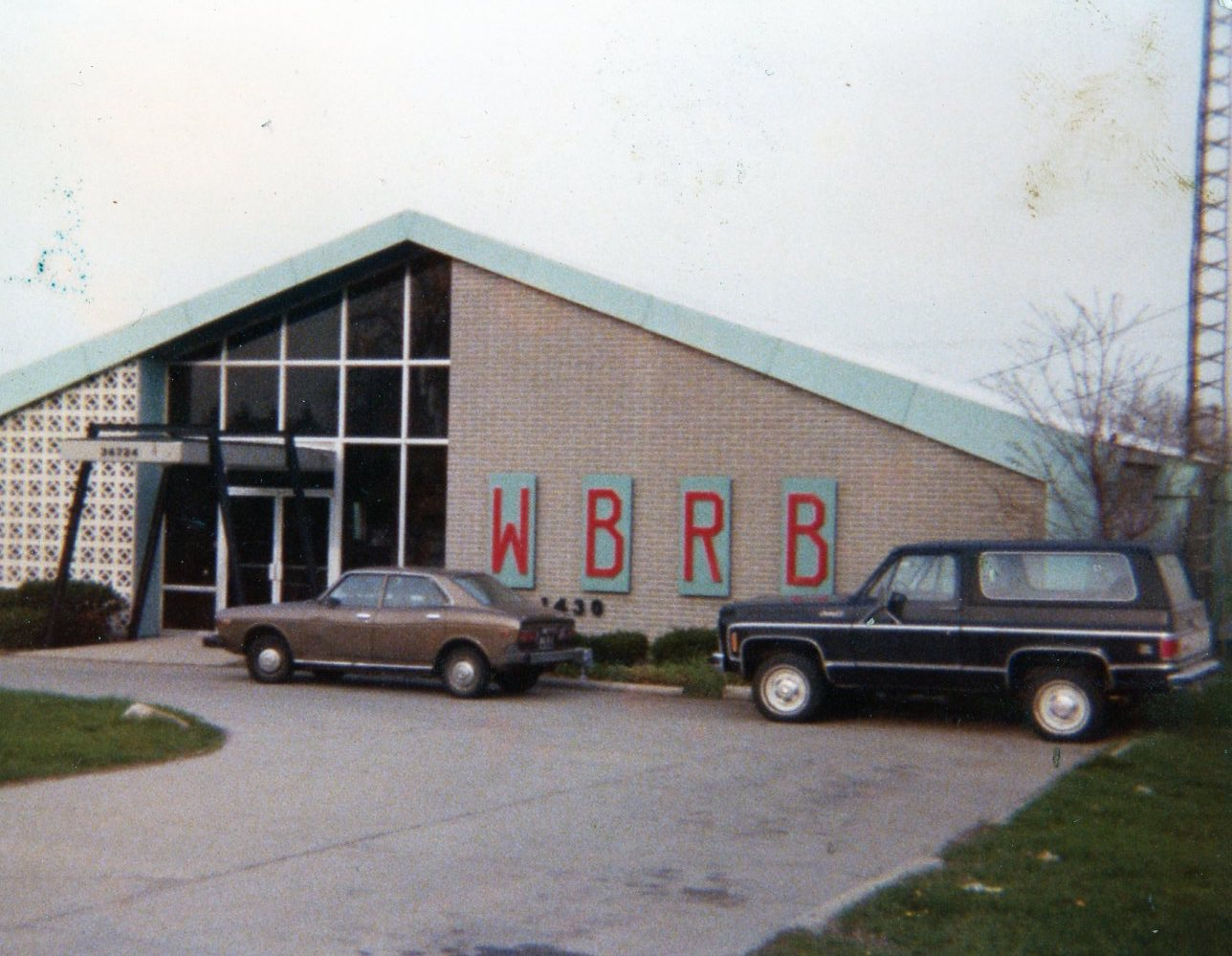
WBRB radio station on Gratiot Avenue in Clinton Township, circa 1977

WDKL began life on November 6, 1960, as WBRB-FM, the FM counterpart of Mount Clemens AM station WBRB (1430 AM) and owned by Malrite Communications Group. WBRB-FM was among the first stations to be directly built directly from the group-up by Malrite, which was originally a 50-50 partnership between Milton Maltz and Robert Wright; Wright divested his stake in the company by 1971. WBRB and WBRB-FM simulcast a full-service radio outlet throughout the daytime targeting Macomb County with a mixture of music and local news bulletins. During non-simulcast dayparts (as WBRB was only licensed to broadcast during the day), WBRB-FM aired beautiful music programming and some country music.

=== WLBS/WKSG ===
In 1978, Malrite put both stations up for sale. The FM outlet was first to find a buyer: Inner City Broadcasting Corporation, owners of New York's legendary WBLS. The next year, the call sign was changed to WLBS, which was switched to a disco and jazz format. WLBS during its disco phase was programmed by WBLS's Frankie Crocker. The station evolved into urban contemporary by 1981, but success was limited due to the station's weak signal. The local stations in Detroit of a similar format pounced on this weakness; urban competitors such as WJLB and former Top 40 station WDRQ in the market took the lead. Leadership in New York called for a change, and the station switched to a "Rock of the '80s"-style new wave music format in June 1982. This format was groundbreaking and innovative thanks to music director Robin Yarborough, who introduced many New Wave artists to the area. Limited success followed, but again, signal limitations were a big problem.

In August 1984, WLBS flipped from New Wave to Top 40/CHR using a format co-developed by consultant Lee Abrams. The station was a weak competitor of hit-music format leaders WCZY and WHYT, and so after only three months, the station changed its call letters and moniker to WKSG, Kiss 102.7, and adopted a 1950s-1970s oldies format called "Kiss of Gold" developed by veteran Detroit programmer Paul Christy. With broadcasters such as Christy, Johnny Molson, and Detroit radio legend Lee Alan (who hosted a syndicated show called Back in the '60s Again), and despite competition in the format from WHND, WMTG, and CKLW-FM in the late 1980s, WKSG did well until WOMC changed its format from Adult Contemporary to Oldies in 1989.

=== CD102.7/Z-Rock ===
In April 1991, WKSG became WXCD, CD102.7, "Detroit's Smooth Sounds," with a new age/smooth jazz format, which returned the format to the Detroit airwaves after WVAE had changed to become WMXD in late 1989. The new age format barely registered at all in the ratings, and less than a year later, on March 13, 1992, WXCD became WDZR, airing ABC Radio's satellite-fed Z-Rock format of hard rock and heavy metal. With a playlist that rocked harder than more established AOR outlets WRIF and WLLZ, WDZR achieved decent ratings for a time, but in 1996, ABC, having acquired the assets of Satellite Music Network, discontinued the Z-Rock format.

=== 102.7 The Bear ===
In November 1996, WDZR changed its calls to WWBR, 102.7 The Bear, "Detroit's Rock Animal," keeping the hard-rock format but transitioning to a local air staff with Ted Nugent as morning personality. "The Bear" eventually evolved into a "Classic Rock That Really Rocks" outlet to compete with softer-edged classic-rock competitor WCSX.

The end of "The Bear" came on January 16, 1999, following the station's sale from Allur Detroit to Radio One. At 6:33 p.m., after playing The Doors' "When The Music's Over" (the same song that ended the legendary WABX rock format in 1984), the station went silent for nearly 20 minutes and then emerged as an Adult Contemporary station.

=== Kiss 102.7 ===
The first song played was "Just Another Day" by Jon Secada. They also revived the "Kiss-FM" brand name as "The New 102.7 Kiss FM, with the Best Variety of Light Rock from the 80's, 90's and Today". The station also picked up Delilah Rene's syndicated nightly request program. The station requested the new calls WKSK, but went with WDMK ("Detroit Michigan's Kiss") after failing to secure its first choice. Then, on August 28, 1999, WDMK shifted to an Urban Adult Contemporary format to compete with powerhouse WMXD, retaining the "Kiss" name. The fact that the mainstream AC format lasted only eight months led some to believe that Radio One had always planned to shift the station's format in an R&B direction and used the AC format as a smokescreen to catch WMXD off guard.

As Kiss 102.7, "Detroit's Adult R&B Station," WDMK remained low in the ratings until October 2002, when the station shifted its format to Rhythmic Oldies and hired away longtime WJLB personality and Detroit Pistons announcer John Mason to do the morning show. The change brought 102.7 its highest ratings in years, and listeners also welcomed the musical shift to more "old school" R&B as opposed to current hits by neo-soul artists which could already be heard on other stations in the market.

=== Hot 102-7 ===
Former logo of WHTD

On June 25, 2005, at 3 a.m., Radio One swapped the formats of WDMK and its mainstream urban-formatted sister station WDTJ 105.9 Jamz. The WDMK calls and "old school" format were moved to 105.9, with the "old school" format evolving into a very gold-based Urban AC. Also making the switch was John Mason, who was switched to afternoon drive at the new 105.9 Kiss-FM as the popular syndicated Tom Joyner morning show also moved to 105.9 from WMXD. 102.7 took on the mainstream urban format and new calls WHTD and moniker Hot 102-7.

On April 19, 2007, HOT 102-7 re-branded itself as HOT1027Detroit.com (now HotHipHopDetroit.com) while re-launching its website to focus merging newer interactive technologies with traditional radio. They, along with KBXX, were Radio One's first stations to re-brand themselves with a new corporate initiative. The station was among the first in Detroit to use text messaging for radio contests (text-to-win instead of call-in-to-win). They also added podcasting features, instant messaging to the on-air personality, live chats and other features to the website. Ratings remained roughly the same, but website traffic grew close to those of its competitors.

For a brief period in 2007, the station carried the syndicated afternoon show The Wendy Williams Experience, and Wendy hosted her first Dons & Divas Party outside of New York City in Detroit that same year.

In April 2009, WHTD dropped the "Detroit.com" portion of their moniker, and reverted to just "Hot 102-7."

=== Praise 102.7 ===
Praise logo, 2011-18

On October 21, 2011, Radio One announced that they will begin operating WGPR, a station owned by a local Freemasons group, effective immediately, under a local marketing agreement. On October 24, 2011, at Midnight, Radio One discarded the Urban AC format on WGPR. Two days later, Radio One moved the Urban Contemporary and "Hot" branding from WHTD to WGPR. WHTD became Urban gospel as Praise 102.7 on October 31, 2011 at midnight.

The call letters on 102.7 changed from WHTD to WPZR at the same time as the format switch. The WHTD calls are now located at an AM station in Toccoa, Georgia.

=== K-Love ===
On May 1, 2018, Urban One announced that they had sold WPZR to the Educational Media Foundation for $12.7 million and three translators. EMF then announced its intentions to flip the station to its K-Love network upon the sale's closure. At that time, Urban One planned on pairing the three translators (which had not yet been specified in the announcement) acquired with their existing translator at 99.9 FM, W260CB, to create "The Detroit Praise Network", and continue the gospel programming via WDMK-HD2. W260CB had recently dropped its urban oldies format to simulcast WPZR.

On August 9, 2018, upon the sale's closure, WPZR began broadcasting EMF's K-Love contemporary Christian format under the new call letters of WDKL.

== Summer Jamz ==
Since 1997, the "Beat" and later "Hot" hip-hop franchise (first WCHB-FM, then WHTD, and now WGPR) has hosted Detroit's signature annual hip hop/R&B summer concert called Summer Jamz. At its peak as a free event during the first eight years, Summer Jamz attracted crowds of 20-30,000 people while located at Detroit's Hart Plaza. As a ticketed event in 2006, the event attracted over 15,000 at the Michigan State Fair. The 10th anniversary show in 2007, the station hosted Summer Jamz in Pontiac's, much smaller amphitheatre and played to a seated capacity crowd of nearly 4,000. The event, now in the hands of WGPR, is expected to return to Michigan State Fair's larger capacity venue for future shows.
