= WMGC-FM =

Classic hip hop radio station in Detroit

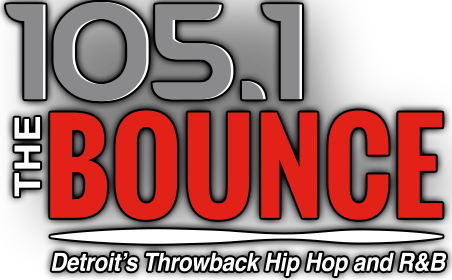
- Detroit, Michigan; United States
- Broadcast area: Metro Detroit
- Frequency: 105.1 MHz (HD Radio)
- Branding: 105.1 The Bounce

Programming
- Format: Classic hip-hop
- Subchannels: HD2: "Detroit Praise Network" (Urban gospel)
- Affiliations: Michigan Sports Network

Ownership
- Owner: Beasley Broadcast Group; (Beasley Media Group Licenses, LLC)
- Sister stations: WCSX, WRIF, WDMK

History
- First air date: March 6, 1960
- Former call signs: WQRS (1960–1979, 1987–1997); WQRS-FM (1979–1987); WXDG (1997–1999); WGRV-FM (1999–2001)
- Call sign meaning: "Magic" (former brand)

Technical information
- Licensing authority: FCC
- Facility ID: 40407
- Class: B
- ERP: 50,000 watts
- HAAT: 150 meters (490 ft)
- Transmitter coordinates: 42°27′13″N 83°9′50″W
- Translator: HD2: 99.1 W256EA (Birmingham)

Links
- Public license information: Public file; LMS
- Webcast: Listen live
- Website: 1051thebounce.com detroitpraisenetwork.com (HD2)

WMGC-FM (105.1 MHz "105.1 The Bounce") is a commercial radio station in Detroit, Michigan. It is owned and operated by the Beasley Broadcast Group and airs a classic hip hop radio format. WMGC-FM broadcasts with 50,000 watts of effective radiated power (ERP) from a transmitter tower co-located with its studios and offices off Radio Plaza located in Royal Oak Charter Township in Oakland County.

== History ==
=== Classical music as WQRS (1960–1997) ===
The station signed on the air on March 6, 1960, owned by Fine Arts Broadcasters. For nearly four decades, 105.1 was home to Detroit's commercial classical music station, WQRS. During its early years, WQRS was commercial-free and listener-supported, a precursor to NPR. Operated by volunteers headed by General Manager Richard Hughes, it had tiny studios at the top of the Maccabees Building near Wayne State University. It also featured folk, jazz and other adult-appeal forms of music. Classical music was one of the most common formats on the fledgling FM dial during the 1950s and 1960s, but WQRS continued with fine-arts programming long after many other stations had dropped it.

Personalities such as Geri Brooks, Dave Wagner and Dick Wallace were well known to fans of music in the Motor City. Dave Wagner was noted for a sense of humor that might have fit just as well on a pop music radio station – regarded by fans as something different in a format often derided as "staid" or "stuffy". Voted "The Classiest Lady in Detroit" by the Detroit Free Press, Geri Brooks had a listenership who warmed to her on-air style and English accent. She served additionally as a program host for the Michigan Opera Theatre.

Never a ratings powerhouse, WQRS nevertheless attracted a loyal audience of affluent adults, as was often the case with classical radio stations. WQRS was also the flagship station for radio broadcasts of Detroit Symphony Orchestra concerts, and the program schedule included such popular features as the "Sousalarm" (a broadcast of a John Philip Sousa march heard every weekday morning at 7:15), and the Wednesday-night "Film Classics" program hosted by Jack Goggin, which highlighted scores from classic motion pictures.

=== The Edge/The Groove (1997–2001) ===
WQRS's classical format was on thin ice following a series of sales in the mid-1990s. Marlin Broadcasting sold the station to American Radio Systems in 1996. American Radio Systems sold the station to Secret Communications that same year, and then Secret Communications sold its Detroit holdings (including WQRS, urban contemporary WJLB-FM and urban AC WMXD) to Evergreen Media Corporation (which later was absorbed into AMFM, and was subsequently merged into Clear Channel Communications). Evergreen was now over FCC ownership limits in Detroit, forcing them to trade WQRS to Greater Media for $9.5 million and in exchange for WGAY-FM in Washington, D.C.

At 5 p.m. on November 21, 1997, the playing of "Closer" by Nine Inch Nails (the opening notes having faded in over WQRS's last piece played, "Povera Butterfly" from the opera Madama Butterfly, Act 2, cutting it off about halfway through) signified the end of classical music on 105.1 after over 37 years and the beginning of alternative rock station "105.1 The Edge". The station adopted the new calls WXDG the following month. Detroit already had two alternative rock stations in CIMX (88.7) and WPLT (96.3), and "The Edge", although it sounded more "progressive" and "free-form" than the competition and did attract a loyal audience, was an overall failure in both ratings and revenue. The WQRS calls reappeared on two stations in 2006—WQRS in Salamanca, New York and an AM in Morgantown, West Virginia.

Former WQRS personality Dick Wallace has surfaced at WIAA, the Interlochen Center for the Arts' classical music station in Interlochen, Michigan. Dave Wagner can still be heard in the Detroit market hosting mornings and evenings at the Detroit Public Schools' classical and jazz station, WRCJ. Another former WQRS personality, Jack Goggin, is a fill-in host at WRCJ and has revived his popular "Film Classics" show (now heard Sunday nights). Geri Brooks died in April 2008 at the age of 78 in Carlsbad, California.

On April 4, 1999, 105.1 abruptly pulled the plug on "The Edge" and switched to the fad format sweeping the nation at the time – Jammin' Oldies. For the first few months of the new format, the station was known as "Classic Soul 105.1", but later adopted the name "105.1 The Groove." In October, the station took new call letters WGRV. The station was launched by a collaboration of Greater Media talent, including market manager Tom Bender, legendary Boston programmer Harry Nelson, WCSX's Jon Ray, and Greater Media Boston's JJ Wright (who did voice-overs for the station). Shortly after launch, Greater Media hired Bill Fries as Program Director from WOCL in Orlando. Bill Gable, formerly of CKLW, hosted The Groove morning show along with Mitzi Miles. Randi Myles (no relation to Mitzi) hosted middays and Doc Reno hosted the afternoon show. The station showed immediate ratings improvement and drew large crowds at Detroit concerts and events. Though the format was built around an uptempo combination of Detroit's musical heritage and "groovin' oldies," the station struggled to improve its ratings. After much research, it was determined that while the station was popular, it could not garner the ratings to win advertisers in large national buys. Other similarly formatted stations around the country shared the same issues and ultimately changed formats as well.

=== Magic 105.1/Soft Rock 105.1/Today's 105.1 (2001–2013) ===
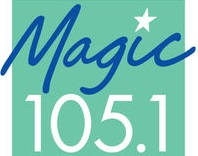
Magic 105.1 Logo

At 9 a.m. on June 30, 2001, after playing Boyz II Men's "End Of The Road", a montage of past promotions and liners and a formal goodbye for The Groove, Greater Media relaunched its trademark "Magic" adult contemporary format on 105.1 FM, under new call letters WMGC-FM. (The "Magic" format was first heard in Detroit on 94.7 FM as Magic 95, from 1976 to 1987.) The first song played on the new "Magic 105.1" was "Because You Loved Me" by Celine Dion.

As an AC station, WMGC competed primarily against the Detroit market's AC mainstay, Clear Channel-owned WNIC. Fries continued as station PD, while noted AC consultant Gary Berkowitz consulted the station. Greater Media also hired Jim Harper, Linda Lanci and Cyndy Canty away from WNIC to host the station's morning show. WMGC stole listeners away from top-rated WNIC almost immediately, jumping to #1 in the Arbitron ratings. The ratings battle between the two stations continued for 12 years.

Like rival WNIC, WMGC typically switched to an all Christmas music format in November and December of each year. In 2009, the station billed itself as "The New Home for the Holidays."

In August 2011, WMGC modified its positioning statement from "Detroit's Best Variety of Yesterday & Today" to "Detroit's Only Variety..." under new Program Director Brian Figula, to reflect its status as Detroit's only remaining traditional adult contemporary station after competitor WNIC's switch to a more contemporary hot AC format as Fresh 100 in December 2010.

On October 28, 2011, WMGC-FM shifted to Christmas music. Unlike in years past, it dropped the "Magic" moniker and began referring to itself as "Christmas 105.1." On December 23, morning show host and longtime Detroit radio fixture Jim Harper retired. On December 26, at Midnight, the station rebranded as "Soft Rock 105.1." The first song on "Soft Rock" was "Don't Stop Believin'" by Journey.

In contrast to WNIC's "Fresh" presentation, "Soft Rock 105.1" was more gold-based and initially played few current songs. By July 2012, the station increased the number of current hits, although the station focused on more retro songs, cutting "Soft Rock" from its name and branding itself as just "105.1 FM." On August 10, 2012, at 5 p.m., it rebranded again, this time to "Today's 105.1" with the first song being "Don't Turn Around" by Ace of Base. WMGC-FM's format was similar to Hot AC-formatted WDVD with newer Top 40 hits added to the playlist, while eliminating most pre-1980s songs, putting it in a Modern AC direction, while still playing select hits from 1975 to 1980. WNIC reverted to its former AC format in September 2012. In response, WMGC re-added some songs from the 1970s.

=== Detroit Sports 105.1 (2013–2016) ===
On August 12, 2013, at 3 p.m., WMGC-FM dropped its AC format (NSYNC's "Bye Bye Bye" was the last song played) and flipped to a sports talk format as "Detroit Sports 105.1." The station became a network affiliate of ESPN Radio, previously heard in Detroit on AM 1090 WCAR before that station affiliated with NBC Sports Radio just a few weeks prior.

Local hosts on Detroit Sports 105.1 included former WRIF morning show co-host Drew Lane, as well as Matt Dery, Drew Sharp, Sean Baligian, Tom Mazawey, Marc Fellhauer, Ryan Ermanni, Rico Beard, Lindsey Hunter and Dave Shore.

In April 2014, WMGC-FM announced a broadcast deal with the NBA's Detroit Pistons. Beginning with the 2014–15 NBA season, it would serve as the flagship station for the Pistons' radio network. The agreement was the first local pro sports deal for "Detroit Sports 105.1," replacing CBS Radio-owned WXYT-FM as the Pistons' radio home. Despite airing Pistons games and staffing the station with sports radio professionals, WMGC-FM did poorly with the sports format, usually averaging about a 1 share of the market, far behind WXYT-FM. In the May 2016 Nielsen ratings report for the Detroit market, WMGC-FM held a 0.9 share, far behind competitor WXYT-FM.

=== 105.1 The Bounce (2016–present) ===
On June 29, 2016, at 6 p.m., WMGC-FM dropped the sports format and began stunting with oldies music while promoting the format of sister WCSX's HD2 sub-channel (which airs a similar format known as "Detroit Oldies"). Greater Media registered 16 web domains for the revamped station, some of which had "Bounce" in the name, pointing to either a classic hip hop or Rhythmic AC direction (the latter format was last heard in the market on WDTW-FM from 2009 to 2011).

At Noon on July 1, WMGC-FM officially flipped to classic hip-hop, branded as "105.1 The Bounce." The first song on "The Bounce" was "The Real Slim Shady" by Detroit native Eminem.

The station continued to be the flagship station of the Pistons for the 2016-17 NBA season in order to fulfill the last year of the station's three-year contract with the team. (Pistons basketball would then return to WXYT-FM beginning with the 2017–18 season.) After the flip to "The Bounce", WMGC-FM jumped from a 0.7 to a 3.1 in the June/July 2016 Nielsen PPM ratings report, followed by an even higher jump to an 8.0 in the August 2016 ratings, going from one of the lowest-ranked stations in Detroit to the highest in a matter of just one month. After an initial buzz, the station has settled into the mid-3 shares in the Detroit market ratings.

On July 19, 2016, Beasley Media Group announced it would acquire Greater Media and its 21 stations (including WMGC-FM) for $240 million. The FCC approved the sale on October 6, and the sale closed on November 1.

== HD Radio ==
WGRV/WMGC-FM was one of the first radio stations in the country to broadcast in HD Radio. Starting in 2000, a company called iBiquity installed one of the first HD transmitters on 105.1 to test and develop HD radio technology. Ease of collaboration with leaders in the auto industry may have been the reason for the test site in Detroit.

- HD1 is a simulcast of the analog (traditional) signal.
- HD2 broadcasts an urban gospel music format branded "Detroit Praise Network".

Previously, the HD2 channel broadcast ESPN Radio programming, as well as "80's on 105.1 HD2" for 6 months after main station's switch to a sports/talk format. The 80's format was a carryover from the WMGC-FM's AC format and had been in place since early 2012 when WMGC-FM rebranded as "Soft Rock 105.1." Prior to that, WMGC's HD2 feed was known as "More Magic Radio" and featured a format of Soft AC hits, ballads, and pop standards. This was launched in August 2005.

Formerly, during the holiday season, when Christmas music would take over the main channel, the HD2 channel would assume the normal WMGC-FM format. It briefly continued with Christmas music after the main station would switch back to its normal AC format after December 25.

Around November 2023, the HD2 subchannel reactivated as a tropical music station branded "Playa". It also fed through translators W228CJ (93.5 FM) and W256EA (99.1 FM).

The HD2 subchannel and the translators had since flipped to Regional Mexican branded as "La Tricolor".

In September 2026, the HD2 subchannel changed their format from Regional Mexican to urban gospel, branded as "Detroit Praise Network". Earlier in the year, Beasley Media sold the 93.5 translator W228CJ to Birach Broadcasting for $450,000, the urban gospel format is once again on 3 analog FM frequencies, fed by 2 host stations' HD subchannels: WMGC 105.1 HD2 feeding 99.1, and WDMK 105.9 HD2 feeding 98.3 and 99.9. The decision to expand the Detroit Praise Network was prompted by poor ratings.
