= Chris Randall =

Chris Randall may refer to:

- Chris Randall (musician) (born 1968), musician and frontman for industrial rock band Sister Machine Gun
- Chris Rathaus (1943–2006), radio DJ, originally known as Chris Randall
- Chris Randall (rugby league) (born 1995), Australian rugby league player
