= Hanna Herman =

Ukrainian politician

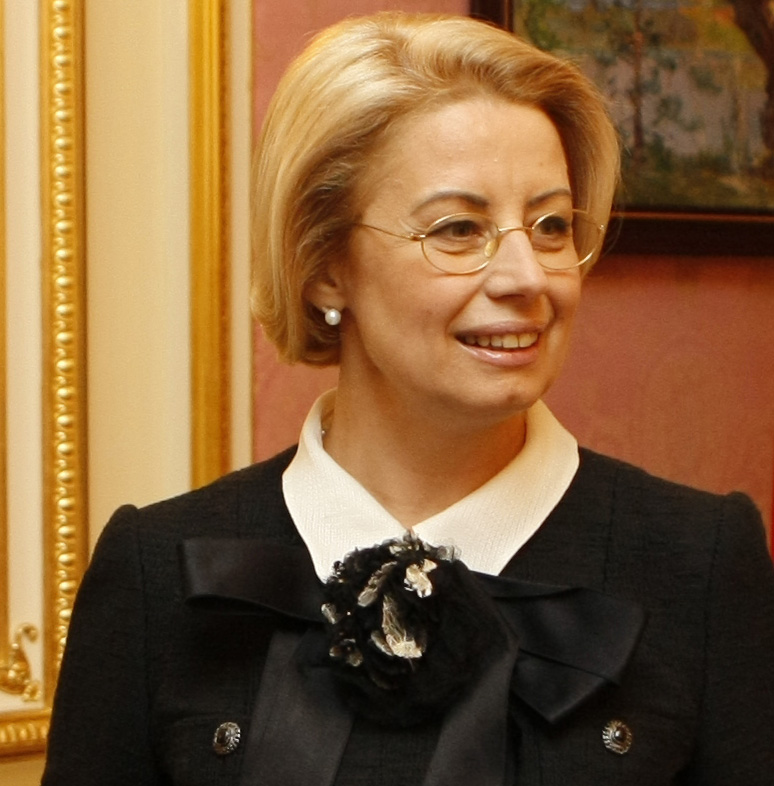

People's Deputy of Ukraine
- In office 12 December 2012 – 27 November 2014
- In office 23 November 2007 – 12 March 2010

Personal details
- Born: Hanna Mykolaivna Stetsiv; 24 April 1959 (age 67) Kolodruby, Mykolaiv Raion, Lviv Oblast, Ukrainian SSR
- Party: Party of Regions
- Spouse: Serhiy Mykhailovych Herman
- Education: Lviv University
- Occupation: politician, journalist, spokeswoman
- Committees: parliamentary: on Human Rights, National Minorities and Interethnic Relations (2012-2014) on Freedom of Speech and Information (2006–2010) on Foreign Affairs (2007)
- Website: HannaHerman.com

Hanna Mykolaivna Herman (Ukrainian: Га́нна Микола́ївна Ге́рман), née Stetsiv (Ukrainian: Стеців; born 24 April 1959 in Kolodruby, Mykolaiv Raion, Lviv Oblast) is a Ukrainian politician, former Member of Parliament of Ukraine, and advisor to former president of Ukraine Viktor Yanukovych.

== Biography ==
Hanna Herman was born in a village of Kolodruby in Lviv Oblast to Mykola Petrovych Stetsiv (1932–1971, worker) and Kateryna Hryhorivna Hanushchak (1936 – 2013, cultural activist). In 1982, Hanna Herman graduated from the Journalism faculty of Lviv University as a journalist.

From 1981 to 1984, she worked at the Mykolaiv Raion newspaper "Leninska Zorya" (Lenin's Dawn) as a teletypist, reporter, head of department. After that Hanna Herman worked at the Lviv newspaper "Leninska Molod" (Lenin's Youth) until 1990. During that period she was a member of the Union of journalists of USSR.

From 1991 to 2002, Hanna Herman worked at the Lviv city newspaper "Ratusha" (Rathaus) as a reporter, while being an independent correspondent of Radio Liberty. From 2002 to 2004 she was head of the Kyiv bureau of Radio Free Europe/Radio Liberty.

Since 6 May 2004, H.Herman was the spokeswoman for Viktor Yanukovych, who at that time held position of the prime minister of Ukraine. She was also the chief of press service of the Cabinet of Ministers of Ukraine.

In January 2005 – May 2006, H.Herman was advisor to the Party of Regions leader Viktor Yanukovych. From May 2006 to November 2007 Hanna Herman was the People's Deputy of Ukraine of V convocation, first deputy head of the parliamentary committee on freedom of speech and information (07.2006–01.2007), member of the parliamentary committee on foreign affairs (01.2007–11.2007).

In August 2006 – December 2007, H.Herman was advisor to the Prime Minister of Ukraine. From November 2007 to February 2010 Hanna Herman was the People's Deputy of Ukraine of VI convocation, Head of the parliamentary committee on freedom of speech and information (12.2007–02.2010).

On 28 November 2006, she was one of the only two Party of Regions MPs who voted in favour of the law recognizing Holodomor as genocide.

On 25 February 2010, Herman was appointed deputy head of the Presidential Administration. In April 2011 – November 2012, she served as advisor to the president of Ukraine Viktor Yanukovych, Head of the Main Office for Humanitarian and Social-Political Affairs, President's Administration.

In 2010, the Ukrainian magazine Focus named Hanna Herman as the second most influential woman in Ukraine after Yulia Tymoshenko. Hanna Herman has been ranked among the top 10 most influential women since the introduction of the rating in 2006.

On 28 October 2012, at the parliamentary elections Herman was elected member of Ukraine's parliament. She became the Head of the Ukrainian parliamentary interfactional union of MPs "In the Support of Freedom of Conscience", which was created for promoting the freedom of conscience, protecting the rights of people of different faiths and beliefs, including the representatives of all churches and religious organizations of Ukraine.

On 23 November 2012, President Yanukovych dismissed Herman from the post of his adviser and head of the presidential administration's department for humanitarian, social and political issues so she could to take in the seat in the Ukrainian Parliament she had won in the October 2012 Ukrainian parliamentary election where she was placed 13th on the election list of the Party of Regions.

President Yanukovych appointed Herman as his independent advisor when he signed the relevant decree No.13 on 9 January 2013.

On 16 January 2014 Herman voted for the anti-protest laws that conflict with Constitution of Ukraine, Convention about the protection of human rights and fundamental freedoms, obligations and duties of Ukraine as a member of the UNO, CE and OSCE.

Herman did not participate in the 2014 Ukrainian parliamentary election.

On 20 October 2014 the publishing house L'Esprit des Aigles in Belgium published Hanna Herman's book "A Girl and Cosmites" translated into French language. Hanna Herman's book was highly valued by the European representatives of intellectual elite.

On 27 November 2014 Hanna Herman's book "A Girl and Cosmites" which was published in French language this year, was awarded Grand Prix Solenzara.

On 24 November 2015 Hanna Herman's book "A Girl and Cosmites" appeared in book stores in the West translated into English language.

On 30 May 2015, together with the publishing house "Yaroslaviv Val" Hanna Herman presented her book at the Book Arsenale in Kyiv. All copies of the book were sold out in the first day of the presentation. The publishing house would pass the money in favor of orphaned children from Donbas and injured ATO fighters.

On 18 November 2016 Hanna Herman was named one of the most powerful speakers in the times of Ukraine's independence, along with dissident Viacheslav Chornovil and writer Lina Kostenko.

She was one of the few former Yanukovich supporters, who did not denounce Yanukovych when he had lost the presidential post. Her phrase "I never decline people – neither when they achieve success, nor when they suffer defeat" – was vastly cited by the world media.

Closely cooperated with Paul Manafort, technologist of the US President Donald Trump.

Takes part in the leadership of an International Women's Religious organization headquartered in the US.

== Books ==
- "Invisible Pyramids" (Ukrainian: Піраміди Невидимі) (2003)
- "Red Atlantis" (Ukrainian: Червона Атлантида) (2011)
- "A Girl and Cosmites" (Ukrainian: Дівчинка і Косміти) (2014)

== Awards ==
- Award for International Understanding.
- St. (Great Martyr) Barbara Orthodox Church Award of I grade (2012).
- Award for contributions to the Ukrainian Orthodox Church (2013).
- Grand Prix of Institute Solenzara (Prize in Literature, founded in 1982, by a number of academicians of the French Academy, professors at the Sorbonne. Among the founders of the awards are known politicians, public figures, cultural establishment of France) for her book "A Girl and Cosmites", published in French (2014).
