= WCSX =

Classic rock radio station in Birmingham–Detroit, Michigan

- Birmingham, Michigan; United States
- Broadcast area: Metro Detroit
- Frequency: 94.7 MHz (HD Radio)
- Branding: 94.7 WCSX

Programming
- Format: Classic rock
- Subchannels: HD2: Country music; HD3: Christian contemporary
- Affiliations: Michigan Sports Network

Ownership
- Owner: Beasley Broadcast Group; (Beasley Media Group Licenses, LLC)
- Sister stations: WDMK; WMGC-FM; WRIF

History
- First air date: September 1, 1958
- Former call signs: WHFI (1958–1973); WHNE (1973–1976); WMJC (1976–1987)
- Call sign meaning: "Classics"

Technical information
- Licensing authority: FCC
- Facility ID: 25084
- Class: B
- ERP: 13,500 watts
- HAAT: 290 meters (950 ft)
- Transmitter coordinates: 42°27′13″N 83°9′50″W
- Translator: HD3: 103.9 W280EL (Yates)

Links
- Public license information: Public file; LMS
- Webcast: Listen live (via iHeartRadio)
- Website: wcsx.com

WCSX (94.7 FM) is a commercial radio station licensed to Birmingham, Michigan, United States, and serving Metro Detroit. It broadcasts a classic rock format and is owned by the Beasley Broadcast Group. The studios and transmitter are on Radio Plaza in Royal Oak Township.

WCSX broadcasts in HD Radio. Its HD2 subchannel carries a country music format, known as "NUTune Country". Its HD3 subchannel carries Christian contemporary music, known as "Smile FM".

== History ==
=== MOR (1958–1972) ===
The original construction permit for the station was issued to Garvin H. Meadowcroft, President of Meadowcroft Broadcasting, Inc. on January 18, 1957, with an address of 1095 Badder Road in Troy, Michigan. The station signed on the air on September 1, 1958, as WHFI ("Whiffieland"), featuring a middle of the road (MOR) format; its office address was at 139 Maple in Birmingham. The disc jockeys included Lee Alan (formerly of WXYZ).

=== Oldies (1972–1976) ===
In 1972, WHFI shifted to a syndicated oldies format provided by Draper-Blore called "Olde Golde". The programming was automated with no DJs. It featured hits of the 1950s and 1960s, similar to Drake-Chenault's "Solid Gold" format except without the softer current hits that the Solid Gold format played.

In July 1973, Greater Media bought the station. The "Olde Golde" format evolved the following year into all-oldies. The call letters were changed to WHNE, "Honey Radio." Sister station WQTE (560 AM) changed its call sign to WHND and began shadowcasting the format in 1974. WQTE continued as "Honey Radio" until 1994, by which time 94.7 FM had gone through several changes. Honey Radio was originally automated using Drake-Chenault's "Classic Gold" format, but transitioned to live personalities (on WHND only) around 1980.

=== Soft adult contemporary (1976–1987) ===
In 1976, WHNE became WMJC, "Magic 95," with a soft adult contemporary format modeled after Greater Media's successful WMGK in Philadelphia. DJs did not speak over the song intros and four songs were usually played in a row without interruption. The format was syndicated by TM and was also picked up on other Greater Media FM stations including WMGQ in New Brunswick, New Jersey, in the New York City suburbs.

By 1987, the adult contemporary field in Detroit had become quite crowded. In addition to WMJC, Detroit had WNIC, WOMC, WLTI, and WNTM, with WNIC and the oldies-based WOMC dominating in the format. Greater Media later brought the "Magic" format and branding back to the Detroit market with WMGC-FM from 2001 to 2011.

=== Classic rock (1987–present) ===
Logo under former slogan

On March 14, 1987, WCSX was launched, with Bob Seger's "Old Time Rock and Roll" as its first song. It was one of the first classic rock stations in the United States, and is also one of few nationwide to have endured with the classic rock format for several decades.

WCSX's most played bands are classic rock staples The Eagles, Fleetwood Mac, The Rolling Stones, Aerosmith and Tom Petty, along with hometown artist Bob Seger. WCSX generally takes a more mainstream, older-sounding approach to classic rock reminiscent of progressive and album rock radio of the 1970s, since sister station WRIF includes a good deal of harder classic rock titles in its playlist, including 1980s glam metal, which WCSX generally does not play. WCSX competition includes WLLZ (106.7 FM), owned by iHeartMedia, which returned to the format in January 2019 with a harder-edged sound, after once being classic rock WDTW-FM.

WCSX did briefly expand its playlist to harder classic rock in 1996-97 (bands like Rush, Van Halen, Def Leppard, etc.) when Greater Media bought then-recently defunct station WLLZ (98.7 FM)'s library, but went back to its toned down approach when WWBR went to a harder classic-rock format. The station also had a short run of playing current songs from their mainstay artists, using the slogan; "It doesn't have to be old to be a classic".

=== Beasley ownership ===
On July 19, 2016, the Beasley Media Group announced it would acquire Greater Media and its 21 stations (including WCSX) for $240 million. The FCC approved the sale on October 6, and the sale closed on November 1.

WCSX kept its format through the sale and has continued as Detroit's classic rock leader under Beasley ownership.

Beginning in 2025, WCSX served as the new radio flagship for Michigan Wolverines athletics, airing all football, hockey, and men's basketball games plus coaches' shows and other Michigan programming. Coverage of women's basketball is shared between WCSX and WMGC-FM when scheduling conflicts occur.

In May 2026, morning host Big Jim O'Brien was laid off in corporate downsizing after 24 years at the station. He was replaced in mornings by Screamin Scott, who moved from afternoons. The afternoon DJ slot is now voice tracked from another market.

=== HD programming ===
WCSX broadcasts using HD Radio technology. In August 2005, WCSX launched its HD2 digital subchannel with a "Deep Trax" format. In January 2014, the "Deep Trax" format was replaced "Detroit's Oldies 94.7 HD2", playing an oldies format.

On August 30, 2021, WCSX-HD2 changed its format from oldies to sports radio. It used programming from Fox Sports Radio and called itself "The Roar". The subchannel then fed two FM translators: 93.5 W228CJ in Oak Park and 99.1 W256EA in Shelby Township.

On September 22, 2023, WCSX-HD2 flipped to an all-podcast format, as part of Beasley's "Podcast Radio US" network.

The 93.5 and 99.1 signals' as of late August 2024 no longer relays WCSX HD-2, and instead relays sister station WMGC HD-2, leaving Podcast Radio US only to be heard on local radio via WCSX HD-2 and internet streaming.

WCSX's HD3 subchannel carries Christian Contemporary music from the Smile FM Network. It feeds an FM translator 103.9 W280EL, in Yates, Michigan.

== See also ==
- Media in Detroit
