= Rathaus (disambiguation) =

Rathaus is the German word for a seat of local, legislative and/or executive government.

Rathaus may also refer to:

== People ==
- Chris Rathaus (1943–2006), American radio producer
- Karol Rathaus (1895–1954), composer

== Stations ==
- Rathaus (Hamburg U-Bahn station), in Altstadt, Germany
- Rathaus (KVB), an underground tram station in Cologne, Germany
- Rathaus (Nuremberg U-Bahn), on the U1 line in Fürth, Germany
- Rathaus (Vienna U-Bahn), on Line U2 in Austria

== Town halls ==
- Hamburger Rathaus, Germany
- Rathaus Duisburg, Germany
- Rathaus Düsseldorf, Germany
- Rathaus Essen, Germany
- Rathaus Freiburg im Breisgau, Germany, spread over 16 locations
- Rathaus Köln, Cologne, Germany
- Rathaus (Oldenburg), a former town hall in Lower Saxony, Germany
- Rathaus Schöneberg, Berlin, Germany
- Rathaus Spandau, Berlin, Germany
- Rotes Rathaus, Berlin, Germany
- Technisches Rathaus, a city building in Munich, Germany
- Rathaus Rapperswil, a former town hall in St. Gallen, Switzerland
- Rathaus, Vienna, Austria
- Rathaus Zürich, Switzerland

== Other uses ==
- Rathaus (Zürich), a quarter in the Altstadt district of Zürich, Switzerland
- Rathaus Bridge, a bridge in Berlin, Germany
- Wienbibliothek im Rathaus, a library and archive in Vienna, Austria

== See also ==
- Ratusz, a Polish historic city hall
- Ráðhús Reykjavíkur, Reykjavík's City Hall in Iceland
