= WBRB (Michigan) =

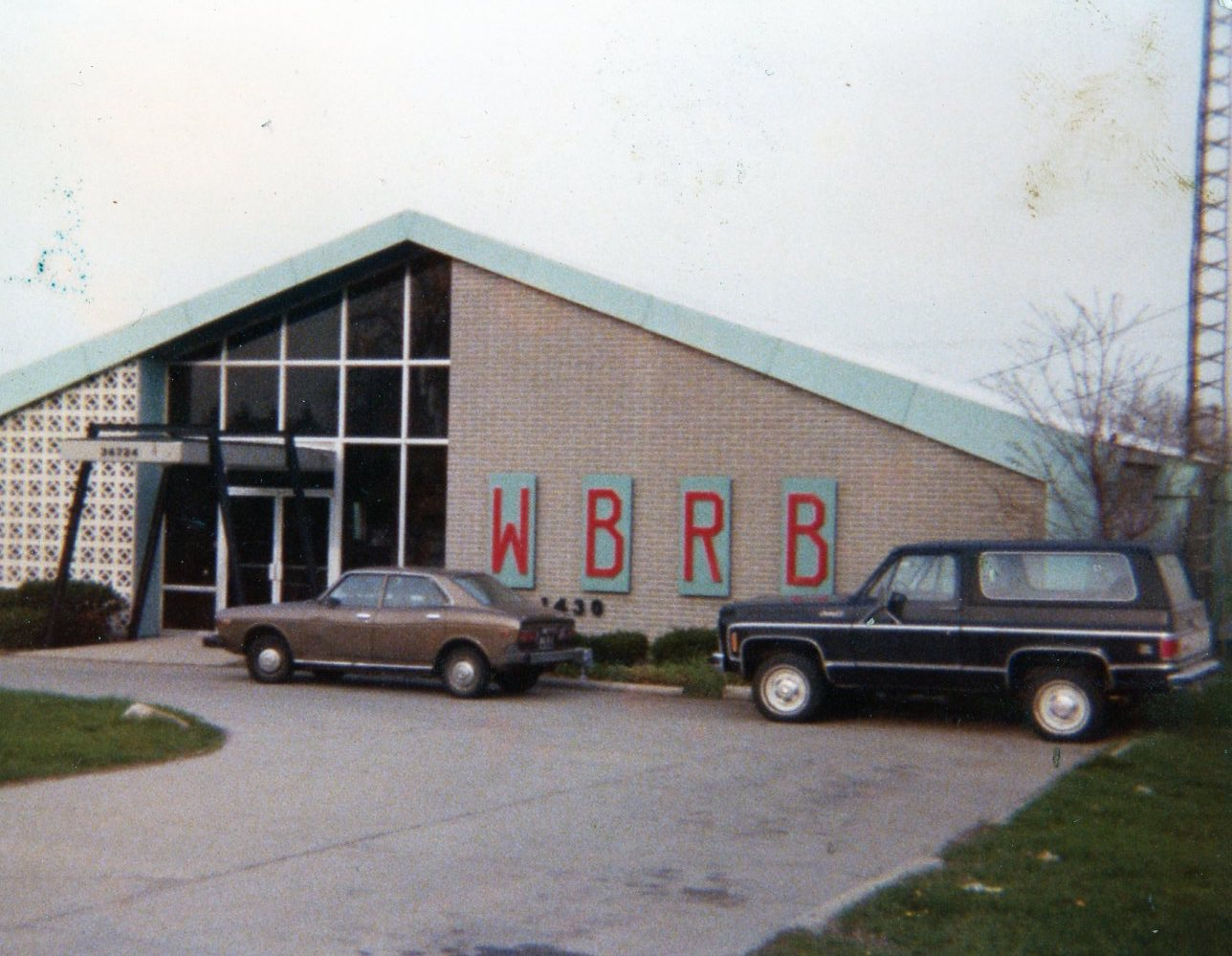
- The WBRB facility in 1977
- Mount Clemens, Michigan; United States
- Frequency: 1430 kHz

Ownership
- Owner: Wolpin Broadcasting Company

History
- First air date: May 18, 1957
- Last air date: January 15, 1990
- Former call signs: WWHK (1982–1984)

Technical information
- Power: 500 watts

WBRB was a radio station on 1430 AM in Mount Clemens, Michigan, United States. Operating from 1957 to 1990, the station primarily served as the radio voice of Macomb County. In its last years of operation, its format consisted of motivational speeches and adult contemporary music.

== History ==
On June 27, 1955, Mt. Clemens Broadcasting Company (later renamed WBRB, Inc.) applied to the Federal Communications Commission for permission to build a new 500-watt station, to broadcast directionally during daytime hours, which was granted by the FCC on December 14. The new station began broadcasting on May 18, 1957, from studios on South Gratiot Street.

Wright & Maltz Incorporated, the partnership that later became Malrite Communications, acquired WBRB in 1959. An FM counterpart, WBRB-FM 102.7, began broadcasting on November 6, 1960; this station began broadcasting country music at night, when WBRB was off the air on AM, in 1965. Under Malrite, WBRB continued its intensive focus on programming about and for Macomb County. The WBRB stations were still Macomb County's only commercial outlets in 1976, and they offered hard-hitting local news and feature programming, including high school sports, tradio, and local news.

Malrite put the WBRB stations on the market in the late 1970s, and the FM and AM operations were sold to separate owners. Inner City Broadcasting Corporation acquired the FM outlet, with its signal more capable of reaching Metro Detroit, in 1978, whereupon it became WLBS. After a buyout attempt by the WBRB general manager failed to materialize, Radcom, Inc., a company owned equally by comedian Gilda Radner, her brother, and two other business partners, purchased the AM station the next year. The Radcom years were unhappy for WBRB, which saw advertising revenues decline, and for Radner's business ventures. The format was changed to big band music in 1982—using Primetime Radio, a satellite-delivered service of Taft Broadcasting—with new WWHK call letters, though ratings did not improve. By 1983, the Radners and Detroit financier Neil Goodman had sued each other over the management of several co-investments, which included WBRB, an apartment complex, and a Detroit parking garage. The station then ceased broadcasting in February 1984 while the FCC evaluated an application made to move WWHK to 1160 kHz.

After a sale to a group led by retired physician Harley Robinson, WBRB returned to the air—and to its former call letters—in November 1985 after an absence of some 18 months. The new ownership group returned WBRB to its roots as a station with a community focus alongside "non-offensive rock" titles (adult contemporary music). The hope was that advertising would improve; by the end of the decade, WBRB's format had changed to motivational speeches mixed with adult contemporary music. However, the loss of the FM frequency limited the AM's reach severely. The station's final day of broadcasting was January 15, 1990; after its evening sports talk show, WBRB left the air for good, and 25 full- and part-time employees lost their jobs.
