= John Mason (announcer) =

Basketball announcer

John Mason is the public address announcer for the Detroit Pistons' basketball games at Little Caesars Arena who is best known for nearly twenty years as the host of Mason in The Morning show, which aired on WJLB, and for his colorful introductions, and is credited with coining the chant "Deeeeee-troit basketball!" Mason's flamboyant voice has been requested at many sporting events, and he was chosen to serve as the PA announcer at the 2007 NBA All-Star Game in Las Vegas. He also served as the announcer for the international All-Star game in Cyprus & Turkey in 2005. Mason is popular with his announcing during nationally televised games. When the NBA on ABC and NBA on ESPN or the features a Detroit Pistons home game, both networks put him on TV when he introduces the starting lineups.

== Career ==
Mason is also a radio personality in Detroit, Michigan. He was the host of the popular "Mason in The Morning" on WJLB for 18 years. He was also host of his own radio show on 102.7/105.9 KISS-FM (WDMK). Mason left WDMK in July 2006 as his contract had expired. Mason was offered an intriguing contract from the Cleveland Cavaliers, his hometown team. He declined the offer, saying the Pistons gave him the raw shot to craft his art in their gym. The Pistons have also given Mason the opportunity to serve as PA announcer for an NBA title contender. When Mason replaced longtime Pistons PA announcer Ken Calvert before the start of the 2001-02 NBA season, back when the team still played at The Palace of Auburn Hills, Detroit soon became a perennial contender for the NBA Championship. Mason saw the Pistons win back-to-back NBA Eastern Conference titles in 2004 and 2005, and most notably saw them win the NBA title in 2004, upsetting the Los Angeles Lakers in 5 games. From 2003 to 2008, Mason saw his Detroit Pistons make an impressive 6 consecutive appearances in the NBA Eastern Conference finals.

Mason independently owns his morning show, Mason Radio Inc. Mason is perhaps the only morning show personality in a major market to own his own show. Mason's morning show is a syndicated program, which can be heard live from Detroit on the 50 thousand watt powerhouse 107.5 WGPR. Mason also won a television Emmy for an entertainment video show (Urban Chartbusters) on the local NBC station WDIV Detroit. Mason has also been an acclaimed motivational speaker in prisons throughout Michigan, and schools and universities in Ohio and Michigan. The Fox network comedy hit, Martin starring Martin Lawrence that ran from 1992 to 1997, was based on the radio career of John Mason and characters such as Gina Waters, Bruh Man, Tommy Strawn, and Sheneneh Jenkins were also loosely based on Mason's friends, as well as characters on his Detroit radio show. The episode was "The Gift Rapper" during the first season and also appeared during the closing credits.

Currently, Mason is the host of the "Mason and Starr Morning Show" along with co-host Angie Starr on KISS 105.9 FM Detroit. Mason also had a syndicated weekend show entitled "Once Upon a Time in Soul," which he produced and hosted in conjunction with Angie Starr and Tobias Smith. The show featured his famous radio characters and legendary artist stories.
