= Arthur Penhallow =

American radio personality

Arthur Penhallow (born December 20, 1943) is a radio presenter who worked in Detroit, Michigan hosting afternoons on rock station WRIF from 1970-2009. On March 30, 2009, WRIF owner Greater Media announced that the station and Penhallow had been unable to come to terms on a new contract.

Penhallow was born in Honolulu, Hawaii. He is a Vietnam veteran served in the USAF from 1962 through 1968. Before beginning his tenure with WRIF, Art was a drummer for The Vejtables, and toured with the Mamas & the Papas. Under the name "Cicero Grimes", he worked at WNRZ in Ann Arbor in 1970, and then moved to WRIF's predecessor, WXYZ-FM, which at the time was airing a syndicated progressive-rock format distributed by ABC called "Love". Penhallow was one of the "Love" format's local announcers and stayed on as WXYZ-FM transitioned to an all-local air staff and moved from progressive rock to the then-new "album oriented rock" format as WRIF.

Penhallow played himself in the film The Upside of Anger.

In January 2009, Penhallow's contract expired at WRIF and he was off the air for more than a month before finally releasing a statement on March 27, on his Facebook page saying: "It appears that my days in Detroit radio are over for now. Thanks for your support over the last 39 years....I shall return."

After months of negotiations, WRIF management and Penhallow were unable to come to an agreement on the terms of his contract. "We are disappointed that we couldn't come to a contractual agreement with Arthur," said Greater Media Market Manager, John Gallagher. "He is obviously a legend in the market and his many years of service to the industry are deeply appreciated. He will be sorely missed." He has since announced a departure from Detroit, relocating to Texas to be closer with family.
