= WDMK =

- Detroit, Michigan; United States
- Broadcast area: Metro Detroit
- Frequency: 105.9 MHz (HD Radio)
- Branding: 105.9 Kiss-FM

Programming
- Format: Urban adult contemporary
- Subchannels: HD2: Urban gospel

Ownership
- Owner: Beasley Broadcast Group; (Beasley Media Group Licenses, LLC)
- Sister stations: WCSX, WMGC-FM, WRIF

History
- First air date: May 26, 1960
- Former call signs: WCHD (1960–1974); WJZZ (1974–1996); WCHB-FM (1996–1998); WDTJ (1998–2005)
- Call sign meaning: Detroit Michigan Kiss

Technical information
- Licensing authority: FCC
- Facility ID: 4597
- Class: B
- ERP: 20,000 watts
- HAAT: 221 meters (725 ft)
- Transmitter coordinates: 42°28′16″N 83°12′3″W
- Translators: HD2: 98.3 W252BX (Detroit); HD2: 99.9 W260CB (Detroit)

Links
- Public license information: Public file; LMS
- Webcast: Listen live Listen live (HD2)
- Website: kissdetroit.com; detroitpraisenetwork.com (HD2)

WDMK (105.9 FM, "105.9 Kiss-FM") is a commercial radio station licensed to Detroit, Michigan, United States. Owned by Beasley Broadcast Group, it broadcasts an urban adult contemporary format. The studios and offices are on Radio Plaza in Ferndale.

The station's transmitter is on Greenfield Road south of 10 Mile Road in the Detroit suburb of Oak Park. WDMK broadcasts in HD Radio: the HD-2 digital subchannel has an urban gospel format known as "The Detroit Praise Network" which is relayed over two FM translators: W252BX (98.3 FM) and W260CB (99.9 FM), both in Detroit.

== History ==
WDMK previous logo

=== WCHD ===
105.9 FM has always been targeted at Detroit's African-American community, with various genres of black music. The station signed on the air on May 26, 1960. Its original call sign was WCHD, a sister station to R&B-formatted WCHB. WCHB was Detroit's first Black-owned-and-operated radio station, then at 1440 AM (now WMKM) before moving to 1200 AM (now WMUZ-AM), now at 1340 AM (present day WCHB, this station was known as WEXL from 1931-2017). WCHB had been founded by Dr. Wendell Cox and Dr. Haley Bell (hence the WCHB call letters).

WCHD was programmed separately from WCHB, airing a Jazz format. Early jazz announcers on WCHD included Ken Bradley, Jo Ray, and Ed Love (who later hosted a weekend jazz program on public radio station WDET).

=== Jazz 106 ===
On March 18, 1974, WCHD changed its call letters to WJZZ to emphasize its musical format. The station played a mix of traditional and contemporary jazz along with some soft R&B artists such as Sade, Luther Vandross and Anita Baker, becoming a precursor of the format later known as smooth jazz. During the 1980s and early 1990s, WJZZ was one of the nation's most successful commercial jazz outlets and a reporter to Radio and Records magazine's Jazz and later NAC/Contemporary Jazz airplay panels.

By this time, WJZZ and WCHB were owned by Bell Broadcasting. WJZZ was one out of four radio stations in the market (along with WMXD, WMUZ and WRIF) that was used on Barden Cablevision's character generated line-up throughout the 1980s and 1990s (which would later become Comcast).

=== 105.9 The Beat/105.9 Jamz ===
At the end of 1995, WJZZ had gained a competitor in the smooth jazz format, with the former album rock station WLLZ flipping to the format as WVMV "V98.7" shortly before Christmas 1995. With WVMV taking a more mass-appeal approach to the smooth jazz format by playing more Soft AC and Urban AC vocals, Bell Broadcasting decided to take WJZZ in a different direction.

On August 23, 1996, WJZZ flipped to Mainstream Urban. It took the WCHB-FM call sign and the slogan "105.9 The Beat," in an attempt to go after longtime urban leader WJLB. Radio One acquired WCHB-AM/FM in July 1998, and the following month, WCHB-FM became WDTJ, "105.9 Jamz." WDTJ aired the Russ Parr morning show syndicated from co-owned WKYS in Washington, D.C. "105.9 Jamz" did respectable in the ratings, but could not beat WJLB.

=== 105.9 Kiss FM ===
The station's current "Kiss-FM" format originated on 102.7 FM in 1999, where it aired for six years. (It originally transitioned from an adult contemporary format.)

On June 26, 2005, at 3 a.m., Radio One made a major change in its Detroit cluster. The company moved the "Old School" rhythmic oldies format of WDMK (102.7 FM) to 105.9; 105.9 took on the WDMK calls and the "Kiss-FM" moniker, as the "Kiss" format was updated to a gold-based Urban AC. Detroit Pistons announcer John Mason (formerly of WJLB), who had done mornings at 102.7, was switched to afternoon drive time to accommodate the syndicated Tom Joyner Morning Show, on the new "105.9 Kiss-FM." (Joyner was previously heard on Clear Channel-owned WMXD.) The "105.9 Jamz" hip-hop music format moved to 102.7, which took on the new call letters WHTD and the moniker "Hot 102-7."

After WMXD dropped the syndicated Michael Baisden show in late 2009, WDMK added the show for afternoons.

John Mason, WDMK's former afternoon drive personality, left the station in September 2006 and shortly afterward announced that he would be looking to syndicate his own morning show, most likely based at independently owned Detroit urban AC outlet WGPR. After Radio One successfully took Mason to court to uphold a non-compete clause, Mason began broadcasting on WGPR. After that station was taken over by Radio One in 2011, Mason hosted early evenings on WCHB. In addition, the station reduced its frequent playing of R&B oldies by playing more currents and recurrents.

=== Radio One flips several stations ===
In August 2011, WDMK was the only Radio One FM outlet that was not affected by WHTD moving its format to WGPR which Radio One began to operate via a local marketing agreement (LMA) agreement with the Masons. The switch was made to accommodate the launch of an urban gospel format on WHTD. In August 2013, following the cancellation of the Michael Baisden show by his distributor Cumulus Media that March, and the interim of Skip Murphy, WDMK became the Detroit affiliate of The D.L. Hughley show. In February 2014, WDMK moved the Tom Joyner Morning Show to WCHB and allowed John Mason to return to morning drive, adding former WJLB DJ CoCo as well.

In April 2018, after a four-year hiatus, WDMK returned to airing the Tom Joyner Morning Show after the cancellation of Mason and CoCo in the Morning. Mason moved to the midday slot, hosting the only locally originating weekday daytime airshift. WDMK carried syndicated programming, Joyner, Hughley, and "Love and R&B" evenings with recording artist Al B. Sure!, in all other dayparts except overnights, which were locally automated. Joyner retired in December 2019, with Mason moved back to the morning slot hosting "Mason & Starr" with Angie Starr.

Former logo

=== Beasley Broadcasting ===
On June 10, 2019, Beasley Broadcast Group announced that it would acquire WDMK and the three Detroit Praise Network translators for $13.5 million. The purchase made the station a sister to Beasley's classic hip-hop outlet WMGC-FM. The stations would continue to carry Urban One's syndicated programming under an agreement with the broadcaster.

The sale closed on September 4, 2019. WDMK retained its Urban AC format since the sale, but with a few tweaks during locally originating programming, with many hip-hop titles removed to avoid overlap with WMGC, and placing a greater emphasis on R&B hits and "slow jams" from the 1980s and 1990s.

=== W260CB ===
W260CB
Relays WDMK-HD2, Detroit
- Detroit, Michigan; United States
- Broadcast area: Metro Detroit
- Frequency: 99.9 MHz
- Branding: The Detroit Praise Network

Programming
- Format: Urban gospel

Ownership
- Owner: Beasley Broadcast Group; (Beasley Media Group Licenses, LLC)
- Sister stations: WCSX, WDMK, WMGC-FM, WRIF

History
- First air date: 2000 (as a repeater); August 9, 2018 (as Detroit Praise Network)
- Former call signs: W206BI (89.1 MHz) (2000–2010)
- Call sign meaning: Assigned randomly by FCC

Technical information
- Licensing authority: FCC
- Facility ID: 148674
- Class: FX
- ERP: W252BX and W260CB: 250 watts
- Transmitter coordinates: 42°26′53″N 83°10′23″W
- Translator: 98.3 W252BX (Riverview)

Links
- Public license information: Public file; LMS
- Webcast: Listen Live
- Website: detroitpraisenetwork.com

W260CB (99.9 FM, "The Detroit Praise Network") is a radio translator in Detroit, Michigan. Owned by Beasley Broadcast Group, it relays an urban gospel format broadcast by WDMK-HD2, which, along with the 99.9 FM signal of W260CB is also simulcast on W252BX 98.3 FM. The stations are collectively branded as The Detroit Praise Network.

==== History ====
W260CB first launched in 2000 as W206BI on 89.1 MHz as a repeater of Toledo, Ohio's WGTE-FM, covering the Hamtramck area. In 2010, it would move to 99.9 MHz as W260CB and become an FM repeater of AM 1200, before experimenting with a format of retro soul hits in early 2018. This would end when the station was purchased by Urban One, who relocated their Praise Radio station from WPZR (102.7 FM) upon that station's sale to the Educational Media Foundation on May 1, 2018. Upon moving to 99.9 and launching on August 9, 2018, the station acquired two repeaters (W228CJ in Oak Park and W252BX in Southwest Detroit) from the EMF to fill in gaps in coverage in the area. Since 2021, W228CJ has flipped several times, airing sports, podcasts, and most recently spanish hits, and as of 2026, a sale is pending to Birach Broadcasting Corporation to make it a translator for WNZK.

Former Detroit Praise Network logo with 93.5 included

==== Coverage area ====
W252BX 98.3 FM broadcasts from a transmitter on top of the Renaissance Center. Since it transmits from downtown Detroit, its signal covers all of the City of Detroit, along with nearby communities of Dearborn, River Rouge, Melvindale and Redford Township. Due to its proximity to the U.S./ Canada border, some of this translator's signal reaches across the Detroit river into the immediate Windsor, Ontario, area, coverage in Canada is limited due to a directional transmitting pattern keeping much of the signal on the U.S. side of the border.

W260CB broadcasts at 99.9 FM from the WYCD/WDVD/WCSX/WMGC-FM broadcast tower in Royal Oak Charter Township, covering Southfield, Farmington Hills and Bloomfield Hills.

Both signals originate from WDMK HD-2, the signal can be heard on HD radio receivers throughout much of Southeast Michigan beyond the limited range of the translators listed above.

== HD Radio ==
WDMK broadcasts using HD Radio technology. In November 2010, the station added an HD2 subchannel with a simulcast of sister station WHTD on its HD2, but this was soon dropped. In September 2011, the HD2 subchannel returned, and began airing a simulcast of then-sister station WCHB. The HD2 signal was used to feed translator 99.9 W260CB. The HD2 sidechannel has continued to feed the 99.9 translator since WCHB was sold to Crawford Broadcasting.

In May 2018, Urban One announced that the company would be selling then-sister WPZR to the Educational Media Foundation. EMF planned to flip WPZR to the K-Love Contemporary Christian network. In return, EMF would sell three translators to Urban One. At that time, WDMK-HD2 dropped its "Soul 99.9" urban oldies format and began simulcasting WPZR.

On August 9, 2018, the urban gospel format from WPZR officially moved to WDMK-HD2 and rebranded as the Detroit Praise Network, simulcast on three translators: W228CJ (93.5 FM), W252BX (98.3 FM) and W260CB (99.9 FM). On August 30, 2021, W228CJ flipped to Fox Sports Radio as "The Roar", and is now fed by WCSX-HD2. In September 2023, WCSX's HD2 sub-channel flipped to "Podcast Radio US", airing an all-podcasts format. Two months later, W228CJ again flipped, this time to a simulcast of sister station WMGC-HD2, which airs a tropical music format called "Playa". Both formats are presented by Beasley in select markets across the country, on translators and HD radio subchannels.
