= WRIF =

Rock radio station in Detroit

- Detroit, Michigan; United States
- Broadcast area: Southeast Michigan; Southwestern Ontario
- Frequency: 101.1 MHz (HD Radio)
- Branding: 101 WRIF

Programming
- Format: Active rock
- Subchannels: HD2: Alternative rock; HD3: Dave & Chuck 24/7
- Affiliations: United Stations Radio Networks

Ownership
- Owner: Beasley Broadcast Group; (Beasley Media Group Licenses, LLC)
- Sister stations: WCSX; WDMK; WMGC-FM

History
- First air date: 1948
- Former call signs: WXYZ-FM (1948–1971)
- Call sign meaning: Guitar riff

Technical information
- Licensing authority: FCC
- Facility ID: 11278
- Class: B
- ERP: 27,000 watts
- HAAT: 268 meters (879 ft)
- Transmitter coordinates: 42°27′13″N 83°9′50″W

Links
- Public license information: Public file; LMS
- Webcast: Listen live (via iHeartRadio)
- Website: wrif.com

WRIF (101.1 FM) is a commercial active rock radio station licensed in Detroit, Michigan, and serving Metro Detroit as well as Windsor and Southwestern Ontario. The station is currently owned by Beasley Media Group. WRIF is a grandfathered FM station. Under current U.S. Federal Communications Commission limits for Class B stations, WRIF, if newly licensed today, would be allowed to broadcast an effective radiated power (ERP) of at most 16,000 watts using an antenna 268 meters high. The station transmitter is in the Detroit suburb of Southfield near the intersection of 10 Mile Road and Northwestern Highway, and transmits its signal from the same tower as its former sister station, WXYZ-TV. WRIF's studios are in Ferndale.

== History ==
=== WXYZ-FM ===
The station signed on in 1948 as WXYZ-FM. For most of the station's early years, the station was simply a simulcast of WXYZ (1270 AM). That changed in 1966, when the Federal Communications Commission (FCC) decreed separate programming for at least half of the broadcast day on FM stations that had been simulcasts of their AM sisters. WXYZ-FM separated programming and aired first a MOR/adult standards format, then later went to a rock-based Top 40 approach called "Boss 101", which featured mostly harder rock hits with little to no pop or soul product. Then in 1970, the station's then-owner, ABC made WXYZ-FM an affiliate of the "Love" network, a nationally syndicated progressive rock format from ABC that predated today's satellite-fed radio formats. WXYZ-FM hired at least one local jock for this format: Arthur Penhallow.

=== 101 WRIF ===
On February 14, 1971, the station unintentionally changed its call letters to WRIF due to a clerical error by the FCC regarding several call station changes by ABC. ABC had applied for WDAI (for Detroit Auto Industry) for WXYZ-FM, but the FCC assigned those to WLS-FM in Chicago instead. The WRIF calls had been intended for WABC-FM in New York, which instead became WPLJ.

Under the aegis of consultant Lee Abrams, WRIF was a pioneer in the album-oriented rock format, utilizing many elements of progressive rock radio while maintaining a tight, Top-40 style play list. Other ABC stations with a similar sound included WPLJ in New York and WDVE in Pittsburgh. WRIF was not a pure rocker in its early years - you could hear such artists as KC & The Sunshine Band and the Bee Gees alongside Alice Cooper, Traffic, and the Allman Brothers. After 1975, WRIF dropped most of the pop artists to concentrate on rock, but they would play a pop or disco song if it were extremely popular. "Stayin' Alive", for example, got many spins on WRIF in 1977–78.

The 1980s are considered the decade in which there was the most change in the Detroit radio dial. Among other changes, a new rocker was installed on 98.7 FM, WLLZ "Detroit's Wheels", and it proved so popular that it took out two other Detroit rock stations. WWWW went country in 1980, and WABX changed to a contemporary hit radio (CHR) format called "Hot Rock" in 1983, and then went adult contemporary as WCLS. But WRIF soldiered on, even though it was sold twice in the 1980s and its rock format was on the chopping block more than once (rumors persisted in the late 1980s that the station was to switch to an urban contemporary format, especially after the debut of classic rock WCSX in 1987). In May 2006, WRIF outlasted yet another rock station but with a twist. WDTW-FM "The Drive" switched to country (this time as "106.7 The Fox") just as it did back in 1980 when it was known as "W4".

WRIF was one of the radio stations in the area that was used on Barden Cablevision's character generated line-up during the 1980s and 1990s. The station also served as a backdrop for the Kevin Costner film The Upside of Anger.

ABC continued to own WRIF until its merger with Capital Cities Communications in 1986. At that time, the station was spun off to Silver Star Communications. The next year, WRIF was sold to Great American Broadcasting (the former Taft Television and Radio, Inc.). Great American Broadcasting declared Chapter 11 bankruptcy in 1993, and subsequently reorganized as Citicasters Communications.

In the early 1990s, the FCC began to permit one entity to own two stations on the same band in the same market for the first time. As a result, in 1994, Greater Media, who already owned Detroit's classic rocker WCSX, purchased WRIF from Citicasters.

On July 19, 2016, Beasley Media Group announced it would acquire Greater Media and its 21 stations (including WRIF) for $240 million. The FCC approved the sale on October 6, and the sale closed on November 1.

== Standings and recognition ==
In 2007, the station was named Active Rock station of the year in a top 25 market award by Radio & Records magazine. Other nominees included WIYY in Baltimore, WAAF in Boston, KBPI in Denver, WMMR in Philadelphia, and KISW in Seattle.

WRIF won the RadioContraband Rock Radio Award for "Major Market Radio Station" of the year in 2013 and 2014.

WRIF was inducted into the Rock Radio Hall of Fame in 2014.

== Programming ==
=== HD channel ===
WRIF's HD Radio multicast signals are called:

- HD1 is a simulcast of the analog (traditional) signal.
- HD2 ("RIFF2") features a modern spin on the old progressive-rock format, with a mixture of underground alternative rock and metal and local Detroit artists. This was launched in August 2005.
- HD3 features highlights of the Dave and Chuck "The Freak" morning show.

=== Morning shows ===
From the mid-1970s to 1979, the morning show had been hosted by Michael Collins. Collins had come from WWWM "M105" in Cleveland. In 1979, WRIF began broadcasting J.J. and the Morning Crew which consisted of Jimmy "J.J." Johnson, Lynne Woodison, and George Baier (better known as Richard T. Bruiser or Dick the Bruiser). In their prime, they were well known with doing news, weather, playing rock, and creating parody songs with their own versions of timeless rock hits such as Question Mark and the Mysterians' "96 Tears" with "96 Beers", The J. Geils Band's "Freeze Frame" with "Beer Frame", Sammy Hagar's "I Can't Drive 55" with "I Can't Drive (point) 2-5", and their own version of Gary Numan's "Cars" with "Bars". The show is also known for lampooning NBC's longest running show, Meet the Press with Meet the Bruiser. But despite WRIF's playing rock and disco songs, J.J. and the Morning Crew created "D.R.E.A.D." which is short for "Detroit Rockers Engaged In The Abolition of Disco". J.J. and the Morning Crew left WRIF in the mid-1980s and moved their morning show to the now defunct WLLZ. (In the mid-1990s, J.J. and the Morning Crew moved to WRIF's soon to be sister station WCSX). J.J. now hosts middays at WOMC.

In November 1985, Joe Nipote (an actor, children's author and Detroit native) became WRIF's new morning show host. Never having worked with a partner before, Nipote was teamed up with then-midday host Ken Calvert. Within a year, Nipote and Calvert did very well ratings wise. However, after a year, Nipote left to return to Los Angeles, and returned to stand up and acting.

In 1991, WRIF hired a new morning team from Phoenix, Arizona - Drew & Zip. Zip left by 1994, and was replaced by local personality Mike Clark. Drew and Mike went on to become the #1 rated morning show in Detroit. In September 2007, Drew Lane left WRIF for an indefinite length of time to take care of his girlfriend who had been diagnosed with breast cancer. In April 2008, it was announced that Lane would not be returning to WRIF. The show was then renamed "Mike In The Morning" and was hosted by Clark and Marc Fellhauer, and features Trudi Daniels with the "WRIF Rock & Roll Radio News," and Jamie Samuelsen on sports reports. On July 13, 2009, Lane returned to WRIF to once again team up with Mike Clark.

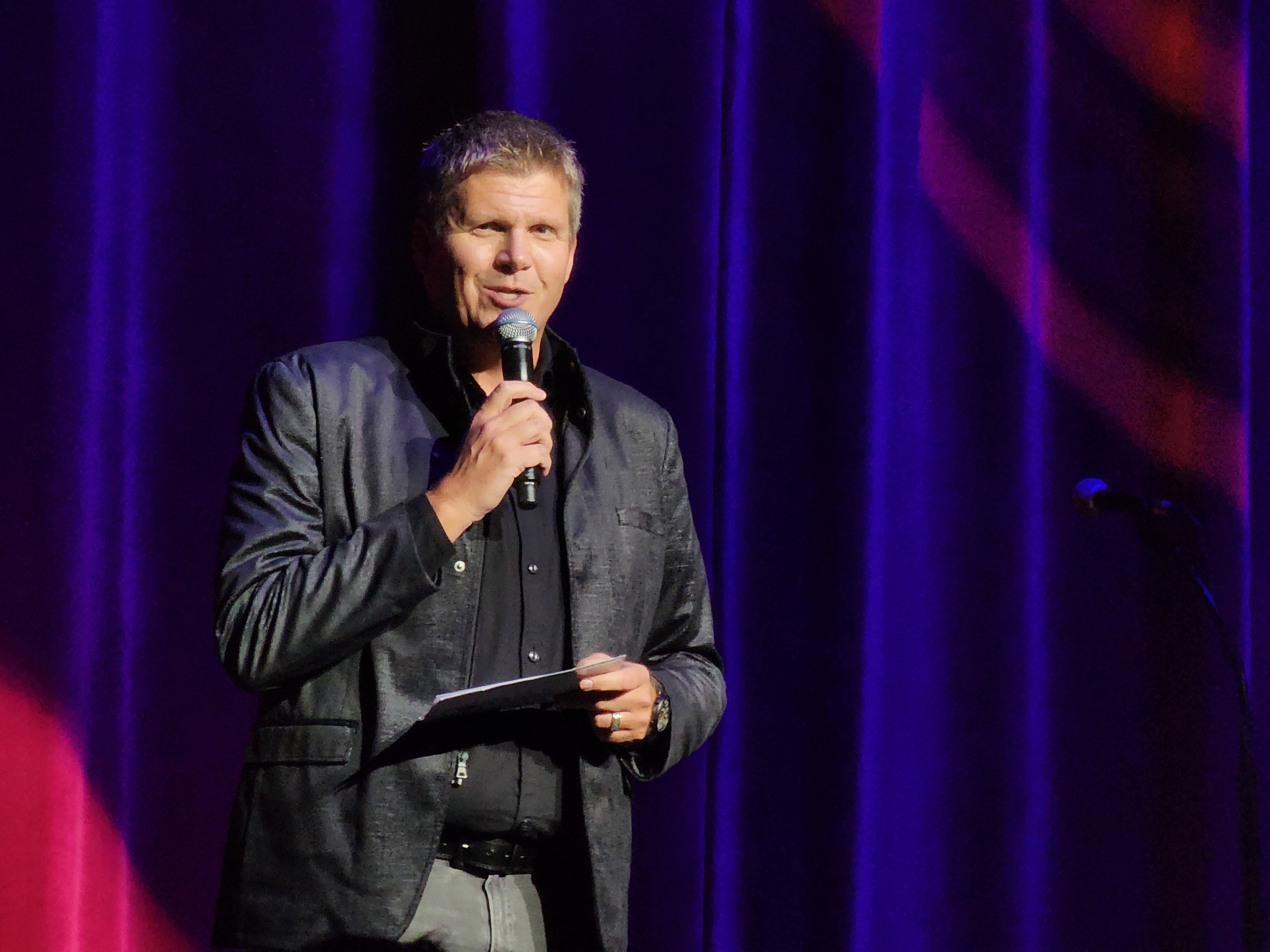
Dave Hunter of "Dave and Chuck The Freak"

The show's name reverted to Drew and Mike in the Morning, sometimes referred to as The Drew and Mike Show, but is mostly just shortened to Drew and Mike. Lane now does sports news for the show as well. Fellhauer, Daniels, and Mike Wolters still remain with the show. In May 2013, it was announced that Greater Media had not renewed the contract for Drew and Mike in the Morning, with the final Drew and Mike show airing on May 17. On May 28, Dave and Chuck "The Freak" of 89X took over morning drive. Since then, Trudi Daniels teamed up with WRIF alum Kenny "K.C." Calvert to form The K.C. and Trudi Morning Show which made its debut on WCSX that summer, while Drew Lane moved to afternoons on sister station WMGC-FM in August 2013.

== Merchandise ==
=== Stickers ===
WRIF stickers are given out at many of the station's sponsored events. Many are unique to that event. Stickers have been made for bands including: Metallica, Ozzy Osbourne and OZZFEST, Mötley Crüe, ZZ Top, Alice Cooper, Kid Rock, Disturbed, YES, Journey, Kiss, Santana, REO Speedwagon, Triumph, U2, Huey Lewis and the News, Loverboy, Aerosmith, Bruce Springsteen, the Rolling Stones, Iggy Pop, Guns N' Roses, AC/DC, Korn, Linkin Park, Velvet Revolver, The Romantics and David Bowie. WRIF has also made stickers for appearances by comedians George Carlin & Rodney Dangerfield and the rock festival Lollapalooza. Stickers have also been made for non-concert events such as the Drew and Mike radio show, Harleyfest, legendary WRIF alum Arthur Penhallow and his famous saying "Baby!", as well as the major Detroit sports teams - the Detroit Pistons, Tigers, Red Wings, and Lions. Since nearly all of them are the same basic size and design (an oval with flat top and bottom with the same size border ring), they are highly collectable, with 700 different designs being created since the station's format/call switch in 1971.
