= WMXD =

Radio station in Detroit

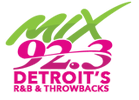

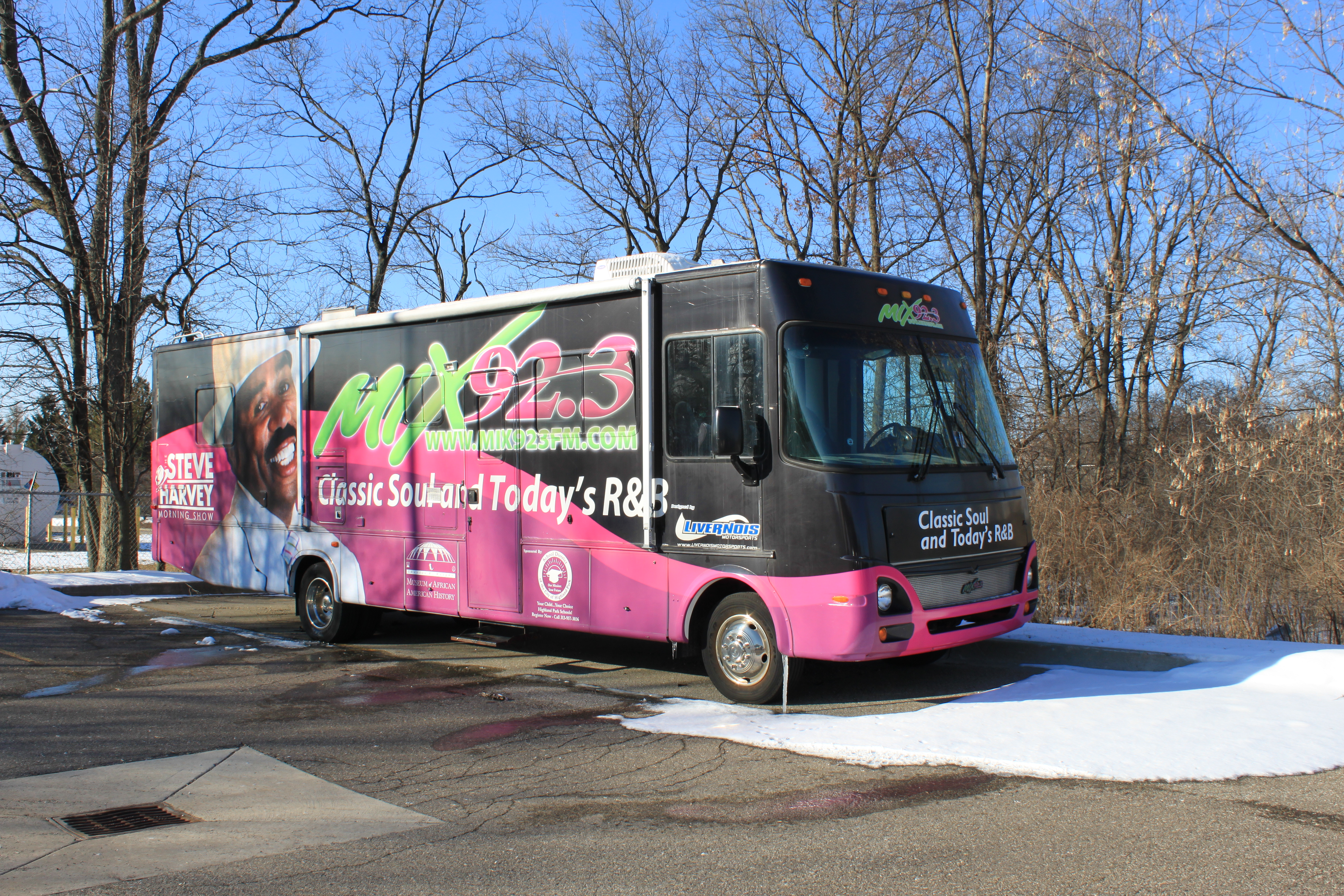
- WMXD station bus
- Detroit, Michigan; United States
- Broadcast area: Metro Detroit
- Frequency: 92.3 MHz (HD Radio)
- Branding: Mix 92.3

Programming
- Format: Urban adult contemporary
- Affiliations: Compass Media Networks; Premiere Networks; Westwood One; iHeartRadio

Ownership
- Owner: iHeartMedia, Inc.; (iHM Licenses, LLC)
- Sister stations: WDFN; WLLZ; WJLB; WKQI; WNIC

History
- First air date: November 5, 1962
- Former call signs: WLIN (1962–1964); WCAR-FM (1964–1978); WTWR (1978–1982); WCXI-FM (1982–1986); WNTM (1986–1987); WVAE (1987–1989)
- Call sign meaning: "Mix Detroit"

Technical information
- Licensing authority: FCC
- Facility ID: 59596
- Class: B
- ERP: 45,000 watts
- HAAT: 145 meters (476 ft)
- Transmitter coordinates: 42°19′55.1″N 83°2′41.7″W

Links
- Public license information: Public file; LMS
- Webcast: Listen live (via iHeartRadio)
- Website: mix923fm.iheart.com

WMXD (92.3 FM Mix 92.3) is a commercial radio station in Detroit, Michigan, owned by iHeartMedia, Inc. The station operates with 45,000 watts of power from an antenna located on the Cadillac Tower building in downtown Detroit. The studios and offices were housed for years at Detroit's Penobscot Building until November 2009, when they were moved to the Clear Channel Communications (now iHeartMedia), studios in Farmington Hills.

WMXD programs an urban adult contemporary radio format. The music selection includes current R&B and classic soul along with an occasional old school hip-hop title. The station is licensed for HD Radio operations and formerly played old school hip-hop on its HD2 side channel.

== History ==
=== WLIN/WCAR-FM years ===
Detroit's 92.3 FM began with a Federal Communications Commission (FCC) construction permit under the call sign WIPE. The permit was originally granted in 1960, held by jazz disc jockey Sleepy Stein and Hollywood composer and musician Henry Mancini. The construction permit specified a power of 10,000 watts from a transmitter location atop the Cadillac Tower Building in downtown Detroit. In 1961, David Kelly formed Downriver Broadcasting and purchased the construction permit for WIPE from Stein and Mancini.

Downriver Broadcasting signed on the station on November 2, 1962, with the call letters WLIN. Bill Hennes hosted the first broadcast from studios on Fort Street at LaBlanc Avenue in Lincoln Park. The studios were built and transmitter installed by chief engineer Art Lebermann. WLIN's original aim was to program a full-service variety format for the downriver Detroit area. The original schedule consisted of morning host Bill Hennes, a two-hour talk show, afternoon drive with Dave Kelly, and evening DJs Ron Rose and Don Haney. In 1963, the station relocated its studios to the Lafayette Pavilion Apartments complex in downtown Detroit, and the format became all jazz music.

In 1964, Hy Levinson, owner of successful "good music" outlet WCAR, purchased WLIN and rechristened it WCAR-FM on December 8 of that year. WCAR-FM initially broadcast from 6 a.m. to midnight and simulcast its AM sister's conservative middle of the road (MOR) format 100% during that time. In 1969, Levinson hired consultant Ken Draper to modernize the music format for both WCAR and WCAR-FM, and the music mix was adjusted from conservative MOR to contemporary MOR. WCAR AM made a brief attempt at Top 40 in 1971–1972; however, WCAR-FM was separately programmed, remaining a contemporary MOR outlet.

=== Tower 92/WCXI-FM ===
In February 1977, Levinson agreed to sell WCAR-AM-FM to Gene Autry's Golden West Broadcasters, Inc., but he would stay on as a consultant. In October of that year, Golden West changed WCAR-FM's MOR format to the syndicated "Great American Country" package from Drake-Chenault. In the summer of 1978, the stations moved into studios in the new Renaissance Center. WCAR-FM's country format was moved over to the AM station, which became WCXI. The FM station adopted the call sign WTWR, airing an adult top 40/oldies hybrid format under the name "Tower 92" (an homage to the station's new digs). Tower 92 was partly live, partly automated, with the air staff including Jack Kirkwood, Joey Ryan, Kurt Kelly, Kevin Sanderson, Ron Tavernit, Russ Gibb, and Tom Shannon, with Steve Schram as program director. The news team included Linda Ashley from WDEE, Jim Lowlor from WDET-FM, John Bell and News Director Ray Cardoza. The station was only a moderate ratings success, but the most successful format on 92.3 FM to that time.

In late 1981, Tower 92 transitioned from its Hot AC/Oldies hybrid to full-fledged Top 40 under the guidance of programmer Todd Wallace, and saw a slight improvement in the ratings in the Winter 1982 Arbitron report. Nevertheless, Golden West wanted to strengthen its country music position in the market against WWWW-FM, and so Golden West pulled the plug on "Tower 92" on May 10, 1982, after only 15 weeks of the Top 40 format. The station became WCXI-FM, programming a country music format separate from WCXI, in an effort to forge a two-pronged competition with the successful WWWW-FM. WCXI-FM and WCXI had distinct personalities, with WCXI-FM being a contemporary hit country format and WCXI taking a more full-service approach and focusing more on traditional country.

=== 92 Music/WNTM ===
In March 1986, Golden West announced they would sell WCXI and WCXI-FM to Shamrock Broadcasting; in return, Shamrock would spin the station off to Fritz Broadcasting, who would pair it with successful talk station WXYT. On May 14, 1986, the FM station was changed to WNTM "92 Music," a satellite-fed adult contemporary format.

Since Detroit already had four adult contemporary stations, 92 Music sank to the bottom of the ratings, perhaps due to its lack of live and local air talent.

=== 92-3 The Wave/WVAE ===
The station's next format was new-age (a precursor of today's smooth jazz format). It mixed contemporary jazz with new-age instrumentals and soft vocals. It was launched on December 28, 1987, as WVAE, 92-3 The Wave, modeled after Los Angeles' successful KTWV. Much of the programming on WVAE was satellite-fed, and the station also featured comedy bits at the top of each hour to introduce the new hour.

"The Wave," an attempt to appeal to the "yuppie" audience, never achieved high ratings, but did have loyal fans, though it was in competition with beautiful music WJOI and longtime jazz station WJZZ, which began to play more contemporary jazz, new age and fusion material around that time.

=== 92-3 The Mix/WMXD ===
On November 30, 1989, the station became The Mix as WMXD. Originally starting out as a rhythmic adult contemporary outlet and playing a wide variety of adult R&B and pop music, WMXD evolved into its current urban AC format by late 1991 under the guidance of operations manager Kris McClendon. Ratings success came quickly after the station tapped the then-underserved Detroit audience for classic soul music. Detroit did have an AM classic soul station in WMTG, but that AM station's directional signal could not be heard in the city's East Side and other communities at night. WMXD was one of the four radio stations in the Barden, Michigan, area (along with WRIF, WMUZ and WJZZ) that were used on Barden Cablevision's character generated line-up throughout the 1980s and 1990s.

By 1993, WMXD was showing up regularly in the top 10 of Detroit's Arbitron ratings, and the format has endured since, surviving several ownership changes. In 1994, the station was sold from Fritz Broadcasting to Booth American, which merged with Broadcast Alchemy shortly afterward to become Secret Communications, forming a duopoly with longtime Detroit urban contemporary powerhouse WJLB. Just a few months later, Secret sold the stations to Chancellor Media, which later merged with Evergreen Media to become AMFM, which was swallowed up by Clear Channel in 1999.

=== The Steve Harvey Morning Show ===
Until late June 2005, WMXD was the Detroit affiliate for the popular syndicated Tom Joyner morning show. In June 2005, Radio One relaunched its "Kiss FM" gold-based Urban AC format on the 105.9 frequency (now WDMK), moving 105.9's hip-hop format to 102.7 (now WDKL) and grabbing Joyner for mornings on 105.9. WMXD subsequently brought in a parade of celebrities such as soul singer Kenny Lattimore to host the morning show until a permanent replacement could be found. The station finally signed on as an affiliate of The Steve Harvey Morning Show, syndicated by Clear Channel's Premiere Radio Networks out of WBLS in New York City (although WBLS itself is currently owned by Emmis Communications).

WMXD's morning and overall ratings have remained strong. WMXD also became the afternoon home to the syndicated Love, Lust and Lies Show with Michael Baisden, as well as the home of "The Sweat Hotel" with Keith Sweat. The addition of Love, Lust and Lies and The Sweat Hotel made Frankie Darcell's midday show the only local daypart on WMXD during weekdays, with the other shows all being syndicated.

== HD radio ==
WMXD is licensed for HD Radio operations. The station featured an Urban Gospel format (provided by Clear Channel's iHeartRadio) on its HD2 side channel until August 2010, when Clear Channel entered into an agreement with the Educational Media Foundation, operators of the K-Love format of contemporary Christian music, to program WMXD-HD2. K-Love programming was heard on WMXD-HD2 beginning in August 2010. WMXD-HD2 also fed five translators around the Detroit metro area, 98.3 W252BX and 93.5 W228CJ, both licensed to Detroit; 105.5 W288BK, licensed to Rochester Hills; 93.5 W228DE, licensed to New Baltimore, and 106.3 W292DK, licensed to Westland - which are owned outright by EMF.

In August 2018, EMF bought WPZR, a full-power FM station at 102.7, and flipped it to K-Love, changing the callsign to WDKL. In return, W252BX and W228CJ were sold to Urban One, and dropped the K-Love programming for WPZR's former urban gospel format as "The Detroit Praise Network" (now fed from WDMK 105.9 HD2). The remaining translators, still owned by EMF, adopted the Air 1 format, now fed from WDKL-HD2. Subsequently, WMXD-HD2 switched to iHeartRadio's Throwback Hip Hop programming. The HD2 subchannel has since been turned off.
