= Chris Rathaus =

American radio producer

Chris Rathaus (also known as Chris Randall) (March 22, 1943 – May 18, 2006) was an American radio producer, program director and talk show host of radio programs. Rathaus passed on the Paul McCartney death hoax to an associate radio dj, Roby Yonge at WABC in New York City.

== Early life and education ==
Chris Randall was born in Albany, New York.

== Career ==
Randall started his career at WPTR in Albany. He moved to WKNR-FM “Keener 13” in Detroit. From Detroit, Rathaus moved to Pittsburgh to be production director and assistant program director at Westinghouse's KDKA.

In 1974 he became program director of WOWO Fort Wayne, Indiana. Later he moved to Florida, where he directed programs at WDAE in Tampa. As Chris Rathaus, he formed the audio production companies MediAide and Studio C in Tampa. During this time (late 1980's) he also worked as an adjunct professor at the University of South Florida (Main Tampa Campus) where he taught a class in audio production. He was the host of a nationally syndicated talk show, “The Rat House”; it was syndicated on 100 stations through the Sun Radio Network in Clearwater, Florida.

Rathaus moved to Beasley Broadcasting's WQAM in Miami, and Clear Channel's WRMF-WJNO in West Palm Beach. He was also the producer of the Radio Ink audio program: “Radio Ink Live” series. In 1998, he was awarded the International Radio TS Worldwide Gold Medal for best audio production.

Becoming intrigued by new possibilities in changing technology, Rathaus left Palm Beach for the Internet radio start-up RadioCentral in San Francisco. At Sirius Satellite Radio he worked as a producer and helped expand their offerings.

== Death ==
Rathaus, at age 63, died of lung cancer in New York in 2006.
