= WJLB =

Urban contemporary radio station in Detroit

- Detroit, Michigan; United States
- Broadcast area: Metro Detroit
- Frequency: 97.9 MHz (HD Radio)
- Branding: 97.9 WJLB

Programming
- Format: Urban contemporary
- Affiliations: Premiere Networks

Ownership
- Owner: iHeartMedia, Inc.; (iHM Licenses, LLC)
- Sister stations: WDFN, WLLZ, WKQI, WMXD, WNIC

History
- First air date: May 24, 1941
- Former call signs: W49D (1941–1943); WLOU (1943–1947); WJLB-FM (1947–1952); WBRI (1952–1957); WJLB-FM (1957–1958); WMZK (1958–1980)
- Call sign meaning: John Lord Booth (original owner)

Technical information
- Licensing authority: FCC
- Facility ID: 59592
- Class: B
- ERP: 50,000 watts
- HAAT: 149 meters (489 ft)
- Transmitter coordinates: 42°24′22″N 83°06′44″W

Links
- Public license information: Public file; LMS
- Webcast: Listen live (via iHeartRadio)
- Website: wjlbdetroit.iheart.com

WJLB (97.9 FM) is a commercial radio station in Detroit, Michigan. Owned by iHeartMedia, it broadcasts an urban contemporary format. Its studios are on Halsted Road in Farmington Hills.

WJLB has an effective radiated power (ERP) of 50,000 watts, the maximum for most Detroit stations. The station's transmitter is in Highland Park near the intersection of Hamilton Avenue and Midland Street. It uses a tower at 149 meters (489 ft) in height above average terrain (HAAT). WJLB broadcasts using HD Radio technology.

== History ==
=== W49D, WLOU, WMZK ===
The station was initially authorized as W49D, with 1,000 watts of power on 44.9 megahertz. It began test broadcasts on May 7, 1941. Then, it officially signed on the air on May 24, 1941. It was Michigan's second FM radio station. The station was owned by John Lord Booth, who was born in Detroit on June 13, 1907, and died in Grosse Pointe Farms on November 11, 1994, at the age of 87. Booth already owned an AM station, 1400 WJLB, and was a major stock holder in "Booth Newspapers of Michigan." That ownership caused a delay in the FM station's grant while the Federal Communications Commission (FCC) reviewed its newspaper cross-ownership policy.

Effective November 1, 1943, the FCC modified its policy for FM call signs. The station's callsign became WLOU. On September 12, 1945, WLOU was assigned to 96.5 MHz. In June 1948, the station moved to 97.9 MHz, with the station's call sign changing WJLB-FM from 1947 to 1952 and from 1957 to 1958. From 1952 to 1957, it was WBRI. In 1958, the callsign was changed to WMZK, which was a play on the word music. The station aired a format of automated beautiful music. In later years, WMZK alternated between beautiful music and foreign-language programming for various ethnic groups. In 1979, the station carried the pro softball games of the Detroit Caesars.

=== WJLB ===
In 1980, the WJLB call sign returned for the third time, along with an Urban contemporary format. It took over the urban sound from its sister station on the 1400 kHz frequency. WJLB (AM) went on the air as WMBC in 1926 and became WJLB in 1939. It had been providing programming geared toward Detroit's African-American community for nearly four decades. (WJLB (AM) is now WDTK, owned by Salem Communications with a conservative talk format.)

Throughout the 1980s, WJLB, which was known as "Stereo 98," aired a Top 40 and Urban hybrid, also called "CHUrban", a forerunner to the current Rhythmic Contemporary format. The station used the slogan "WJLB FM 98, Detroit's Strongest Songs!" in 1986. The rollout featured a commercial of people working out to the song "Problèmes d'Amour" by Alexander Robotnick.

Logo as FM98 WJLB

The station later evolved to mainstream urban contemporary as "FM 98 WJLB" by 1988. WJLB performed well in the Detroit Arbitron ratings, despite picking up competition from several rivals, including WHYT 96.3 FM, which mixed dance music with Top 40. In 1992, WHYT flipped to "96.3 Jamz" and aired a rhythmic contemporary format. Another competitor arrived in 1996 at the 105.9 frequency, the former Jazz-formatted WJZZ. It became WCHB-FM "The Beat", and later WDTJ "105.9 Jamz" (now urban AC-formatted WDMK "105.9 Kiss-FM").

FM 98 WJLB was known for its specialty Friday mix shows, with songs dating back to the 1980s, hosted by the DJ known as the "Electrifying Mojo." WJLB also featured a Saturday Night Hip-Hop Show "The Rap Blast." On weekends, WJLB also had "Sunday Night Segue", hosted by Johnny "Smooth" Edwards which featured classic "Quiet Storm" tracks. The station also had a truly successful popular morning show "Mason And Company" which ran on WJLB from 1986 to 2001.

=== Changes in ownership ===
In April 1994, Booth American Company merged with Broadcast Alchemy to become Secret Communications. In August, Chancellor Media acquired the station from Secret Communications. In 1997, Chancellor Media and Evergreen, which already owned WKQI "Q95.5" and WQRS, later merged to form AMFM, Inc. Then in November 1999, AMFM, Inc. was purchased by Clear Channel Communications. In 2014, Clear Channel became iHeartMedia, Inc.

With iHeart owning both WJLB and Urban AC WMXD 92.3, WJLB is focusing on a younger audience. WJLB's playlist includes more modern Hip Hop and newer titles. It has less Old-school hip hop, R&B, and House music which is found on WMXD. In October 2017, after 31 years as "FM 98", the station rebranded as "97.9 WJLB", featuring a logo template used by many of iHeart's "Real"-branded urban stations.
