= WNIC =

Radio station in Dearborn–Detroit, Michigan, United States

- Dearborn, Michigan; United States
- Broadcast area: Metro Detroit
- Frequency: 100.3 MHz (HD Radio)
- Branding: 100.3 WNIC

Programming
- Format: Adult contemporary
- Subchannels: HD2: TikTok Radio
- Affiliations: Premiere Networks

Ownership
- Owner: iHeartMedia; (iHM Licenses, LLC)
- Sister stations: WDFN; WLLZ; WJLB; WKQI; WMXD

History
- First air date: December 22, 1946
- Former call signs: WKMH-FM (1946–1963); WKNR-FM (1963–1972); WNIC-FM (1972–1987)
- Call sign meaning: "Nice" (from former beautiful music format)

Technical information
- Licensing authority: FCC
- Facility ID: 6594
- Class: B
- ERP: 32,000 watts
- HAAT: 183 meters (600 ft)
- Transmitter coordinates: 42°23′22.1″N 83°8′52.7″W

Links
- Public license information: Public file; LMS
- Webcast: Listen live (via iHeartRadio)
- Website: wnic.iheart.com

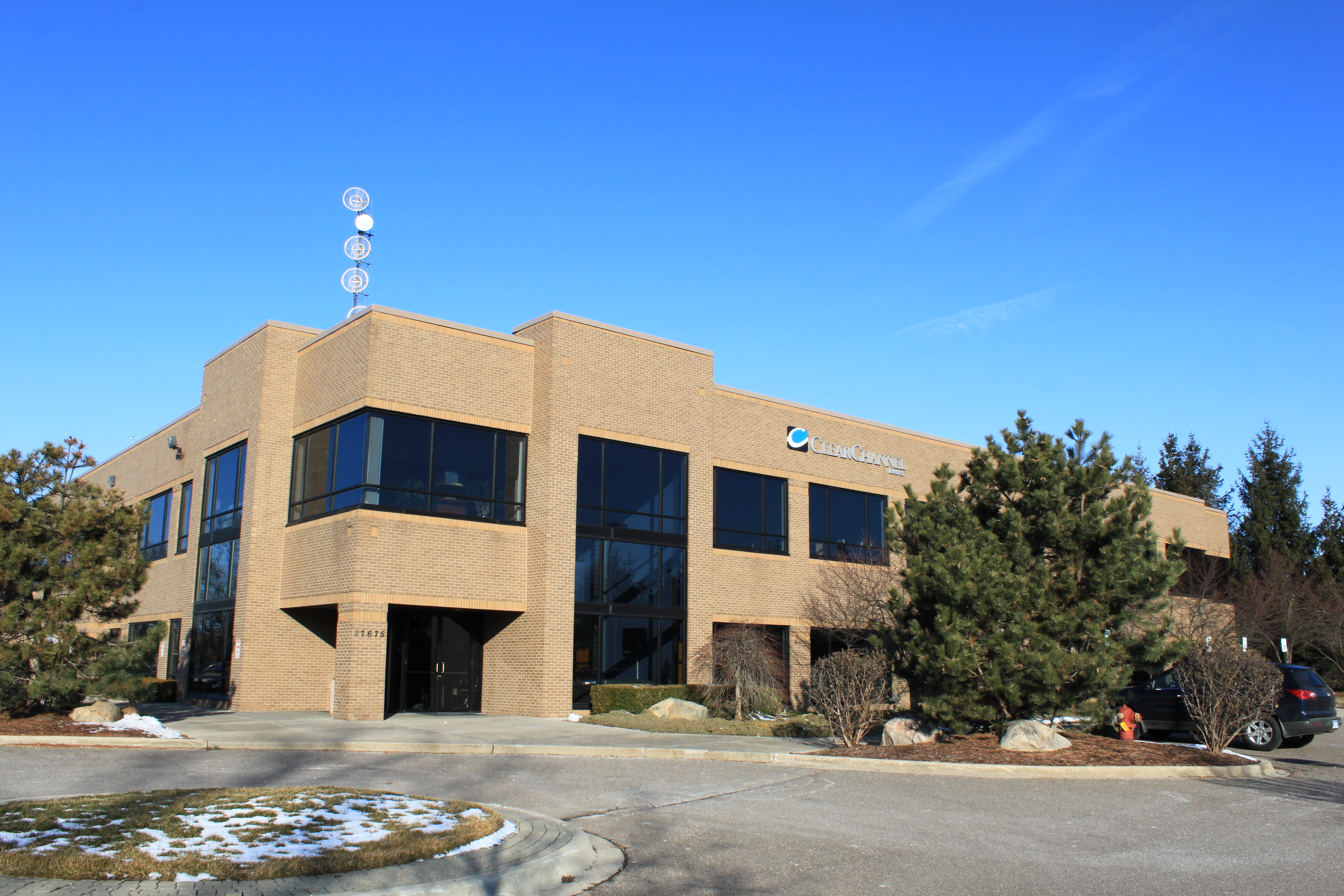
Former iHeartMedia Building, previous location of the WNIC studios

WNIC (100.3 FM) is a commercial radio station licensed to Dearborn, Michigan, and serving the Metro Detroit media market. Owned by iHeartMedia, WNIC broadcasts an adult contemporary radio format, switching to Christmas music for most of November and December.

WNIC's studios and offices were formerly located in Farmington Hills. In 2022 the station along with five others relocated their headquarters to the former Detroit Brewing Co. building in Eastern Market. The station's transmitter is located near Schoolcraft Avenue and Turner Street on the Near West Side of Detroit. WNIC broadcasts with an effective radiated power of 32,000 watts from an antenna 600 feet in height. The station is licensed for HD Radio operation and features iHeartRadio's "TikTok Radio" service on its HD2 channel.

== History ==
=== WKMH-FM ===
WNIC signed on the air on December 22, 1946, as WKMH-FM, sister station to WKMH (1310 AM; now WDTW). Both stations were, and still are, licensed to Dearborn. With FM radio still in its early stages, the two stations largely simulcast their programming through the 1970s.

=== WKNR-FM and Top 40 format ===
On Halloween 1963, WKMH-AM-FM became WKNR-AM-FM, and legendary Top 40 radio station "Keener 13" was born, beginning a three-and-a-half-year reign at the top of Detroit's radio ratings until it was toppled by CKLW in nearby Windsor, Ontario, in 1967. WKMH's FM signal at 100.3 chiefly simulcast Keener AM (with automated Top 40 programming during non-simulcast times). In 1969, inspired by the success of groundbreaking progressive rock station 99.5 WABX (now WYCD), WKMH-FM adopted its own progressive rock sound. "Uncle" Russ Gibb was the WKNR-FM disc jockey who helped to spread the rumor that Paul McCartney was dead. According to Gibb, a college student in Ann Arbor called him on the air one Sunday afternoon and explained the theory to him. The rumor took off from there and generated much publicity for Gibb and WKNR-FM. It was air personality Chris Randall who phoned WABC New York City DJ Roby Yonge. Yonge put the rumor on the air in New York and was responsible for it spreading nationwide.

=== "Stereo Island" and transition to adult contemporary ===
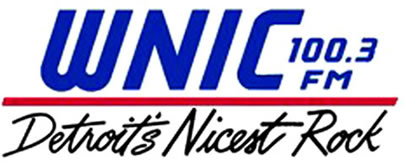
100.3 WNIC Logo 1990-2002

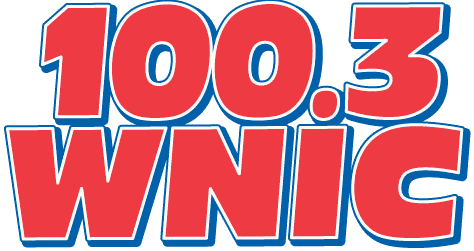
100.3 WNIC Logo 2003–2010

WKNR-FM dropped its progressive rock format in 1971 to become "Stereo Island", a cross between Beautiful Music and Middle of the Road that could be described as an early form of what would later be called Soft Adult Contemporary. "Stereo Island" was successful and spawned imitators such as WFMK in Lansing, Michigan. In 1972, both WKNR and WKNR-FM were sold and became WNIC-AM-FM, simulcasting a straightforward Beautiful Music format. The WNIC call letters were meant to denote the station's "NICe" music. In 1976, WNIC adopted a more up-tempo sound called "Rock 'n' Easy", and moved to its current adult contemporary format.

In the early 1990s, WNIC adopted the slogan "Detroit's Nicest Rock", airing a soft rock format. WNIC scored its first number-one placing in the monthly Arbitron ratings in Detroit in 1998.

In 2003, the station transitioned to a more upbeat mainstream AC format, began using the new slogan "Your Variety Station", and played a variety of music from the 1960s through the present day, with an emphasis on Gold and only playing a handful of current and re-current songs. The station's longtime evening request and dedication show "Pillow Talk" remained, and "Flashback Weekends" were added, featuring upbeat 1960s, 1970s, and 1980s music.

=== Fresh 100.3, return to WNIC ===
Fresh 100.3 logo 2010–2013

On December 27, 2010, following its annual Christmas music programming and running a two-hour "music test" from 2:00 p.m. to 4:10 p.m. (running short snippets of songs from a variety of genres and advising listeners to poll them through the station's website; the last song before the "test" was "If It's Love" by Train), WNIC dropped its long-time mainstream AC format and shifted to Hot Adult Contemporary as Fresh 100.3; the first song as "Fresh" was "Raise Your Glass" by P!nk (by coincidence, one of the final songs polled in the "test"). Clear Channel's Detroit operations manager Todd Thomas stated that the new format was "the music that radio listeners in Detroit told us they wanted to hear", and "a unique sound on 100.3 for 2011 and beyond". The new format competed primarily with WDVD.

In December 2011, WNIC began to backtrack on its format changes, reflected by the amended slogan "Variety From Today & Back In The Day". The station also adjusted its on-air lineup adding Billy The Kidd for nights.

On November 7, 2013, at noon, after playing "Don't You (Forget About Me)" by Simple Minds, and coinciding with the start of the station's annual shift to all Christmas music, WNIC dropped the "Fresh" branding and reverted to 100.3 WNIC as its on-air brand. While the station continued with its more upbeat format, WNIC has added an increased amount of 1980s and 1990s music, as well as an occasional 1970s song.

WNIC, WOMC, and WDVD gained new competition from November 2018 to November 2020 with the flip of WDZH to Soft AC. Four Detroit radio stations had competed for the 25-54 year-old female audience before WDZH flipped to alternative rock on November 19, 2020.

== Christmas Music ==
Each year, usually on the first Friday of November, WNIC switches its format to an all-Christmas music.
