= CFCO-FM =

Radio station in Chatham–Kent, Ontario, Canada

- Chatham-Kent, Ontario; Canada
- Broadcast area: Southwestern Ontario; Southeast Michigan
- Frequency: 91.3 MHz
- Branding: Big Country 91.3

Programming
- Format: Country music

Ownership
- Owner: Blackburn Radio
- Sister stations: CKSY-FM; CKUE-FM

History
- First air date: 1926
- Former call signs: 10BT (1926–1928); CFCO (1928–2026)
- Former frequencies: 630 kHz (1926–2026); CFCO-1-FM 92.9 MHz (2000–2026)
- Call sign meaning: Coming From Chatham Ontario

Technical information
- Licensing authority: CRTC
- Class: B
- ERP: 1,250 watts
- HAAT: 132.7 metres (435 ft)
- Transmitter coordinates: 42°20′3″N 82°16′53″W

Links
- Webcast: Listen live (via iHeartRadio)
- Website: bigcountry913.com

CFCO-FM (91.3 FM, "Big Country 91.3") is a commercial radio station licensed to Chatham-Kent, Ontario, Canada, featuring a news, sports, and country music format. The station, owned by London, Ontario-based Blackburn Radio, features a heavy local news commitment.

Until its FM conversion in 2026, CFCO was one of the few dedicated country music stations on the AM dial in North America, as well as one of the few to do so in C-QUAM AM stereo, formerly at 630 kHz.

== History ==
=== Classic Gold 630 ===
The AM radio station has been on the air since 1926. CFCO, which stands for "Coming From Chatham Ontario", featured middle of the road and adult contemporary formats through much of its history, moving to an oldies format around 1992, as Classic Gold 630.

The station made several upgrades during this period under the ownership of Bea-Ver Broadcasting, including an increase in nighttime power from 1,000 to 6,000 watts (the station broadcast with 10,000 watts by day). The high quality of the AM stereo audio of CFCO was for a time even featured on a tuner manufacturer's website.

=== CFCO-1-FM ===
In 2000, the station added its FM signal on 92.9 (CFCO-1-FM) to improve reception of the station's programming in office buildings in Chatham. The FM simulcast the AM full time and initially broadcast with only 50 watts of power (later quintupled to 250 watts).

=== Country 92.9 & AM 630 ===
On March 3, 2008, at 9 a.m., after sixteen years as an oldies station, Classic Gold 630 came to an end with the song "The Beat Goes On" by Sonny and Cher, after which CFCO signed on the new country music format with "Play Something Country" by Brooks & Dunn. Opening the station was 32-year CFCO vet George Brooks. This is the first time Chatham-Kent has had its own country music station, although now-sister station CHYR-FM in nearby Leamington was a country station for most of the 1990s and sister station CJSP-FM, also in Leamington, debuted its own country format prior to CFCO's change. Besides CFCO and CJSP, other country stations owned by Blackburn Radio are CHOK in Sarnia-Lambton, CJWF-FM in Windsor, and CKNX in Wingham.

In March 2011, CFCO began referring the station as Country 92-9 FM CFCO with no mention of 630 AM. By 2015, it would include 630 AM once more.

=== The move to 91.3 FM ===
On July 2, 2024, Blackburn Radio submitted an application to migrate CFCO to the FM band on a full-time basis as CFCO-FM, shutting down AM 630 and FM 92.9 in favour of a 1,250-watt transmitter on 91.3 MHz. This was after the CRTC and FCC agreed that 91.3 MHz was a usable frequency in Chatham, on May 13, 2024. The application was approved on April 14, 2025.

As of January 12th 2026, the station began to test its signal at 91.3 FM. They will broadcast on AM 630, FM 92.9 and the new FM 91.3 for 3 months to migrate listeners to the new signal before shutting down AM 630 and its repeater at 92.9 FM.

On February 10, 2026, it was announced that CFCO would make its full transition to the FM band effective April 25, 2026. AM 630 and 92.9 FM left the airwaves for the last time on April 25, 2026, with 91.3 FM carrying the station on solo as CFCO-FM, branded as Big Country 91.3.
