= WNUC-LP =

- Detroit, Michigan; United States
- Broadcast area: North End; New Center; Downtown
- Frequency: 96.7 MHz
- Branding: 96.7 FM Detroit

Programming
- Language: English
- Format: community radio; talk radio; urban gospel
- Affiliations: Pacifica Radio Network

Ownership
- Owner: North End Woodward Community Coalition

History
- First air date: May 28, 2016
- Call sign meaning: "North End Uniting Communities"

Technical information
- Licensing authority: FCC
- Facility ID: 196589
- Class: FL
- ERP: 58 watts
- HAAT: 39.8 metres (131 ft)
- Transmitter coordinates: 42°22′21″N 83°04′42″W

Links
- Public license information: LMS
- Website: wnuc.org

WNUC-LP (96.7 FM) is a community radio station in Detroit, Michigan, having launched in 2016 as a grassroots affiliate of Pacifica Radio. The station covers the immediate New Center neighborhood, and from Downtown Detroit to North End. Its format is a mixture of Urban Gospel and community talk radio.

Due to its proximity and shared frequency with CHYR-FM in Leamington, Ontario, the stations do have conflicting interference within the downtowns of both Detroit and Windsor.

== See also ==
- List of community radio stations in the United States
