= WFCB-LP =

Ferndale, Michigan; United States
- Broadcast area: Ferndale, North End and Royal Oak
- Frequency: 100.7 MHz

Programming
- Language: English
- Format: Community radio, local music, indie music

Ownership
- Owner: Ferndale Radio, Inc.

History
- First air date: August 4, 2017
- Call sign meaning: "Ferndale Community Broadcasting"

Technical information
- Licensing authority: FCC
- Facility ID: 194907
- Class: FL
- ERP: 100 watts
- HAAT: 81 feet (25 m)
- Transmitter coordinates: 42°27′50″N 83°07′41″W

Links
- Public license information: LMS
- Website: ferndaleradio.com

WFCB-LP (100.7 FM) is a community radio station in Ferndale, Michigan, owned by Ferndale Radio, Incorporated, formerly known as Underwood V Radio, Incorporated (pronounced "Underwood Five Radio"), having launched in 2017. Ferndale Radio was created by five friends who have a strong passion for music and missed the freedom and creative expression of college radio. The studio and tower is located in the heart of Ferndale at the Rust Belt Market. The station covers the immediate Ferndale and Royal Oak areas, as well as portions of Detroit's North End. The station is a non profit 501c 3 run completely by volunteers and supported by donations and local underwriters.

The station's application was confirmed as acceptable by Industry Canada for coordination purposes under NARBA, on July 25, 2014, and its construction permit was granted on August 7, 2014. Due to its proximity and frequency, the station is subject to interference from nearby CKUE-FM-1 in Windsor, Ontario, which broadcasts at a substantially higher power (3.84 kW) from a tower very close to the Canada–United States border.

In 2020 and 2021, the station started raising funds for online streaming. Ferndale Project, a local brewery in Ferndale, brewed a Ferndale Radio beer and part of the proceeds were donated to their streaming efforts. Ferndale Radio started streaming in 2022.
