= MUFI =

MUFI and Mufi may refer to:

- Medieval Unicode Font Initiative, a project which aims to coordinate the encoding and display of special characters in medieval texts written in the Latin alphabet, which are not encoded as part of Unicode
- Michigan Urban Farming Initiative, an American 501(c)(3) nonprofit organization based in Detroit, Michigan
- Mufi Hannemann, former mayor of Honolulu
