= Frances Harper Inn =

- U.S. National Register of Historic Places
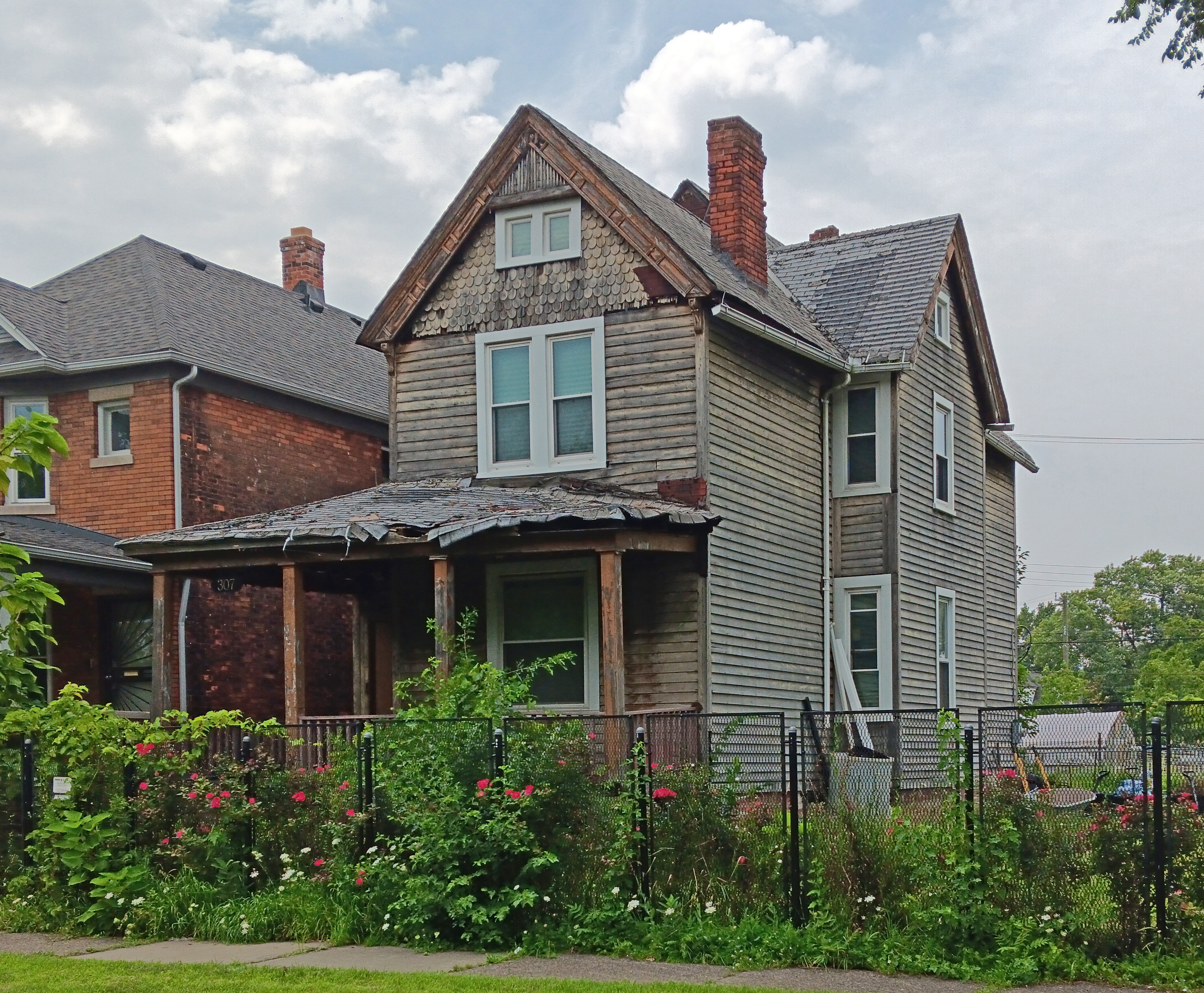
- Frances Harper Inn in 2023
- Interactive map
- Location: 307 Horton St. Detroit, Michigan
- Coordinates: 42°22′22″N 83°4′11″W
- Built: c. 1893
- Architectural style: Queen Anne
- NRHP reference No.: 100008814
- Added to NRHP: July 21, 2023

The Frances Harper Inn is a house located at 307 Horton Street in Detroit, Michigan. It is significant for its operation, between about 1915 and 1950, by the Christian Industrial Club, a Detroit Black women's club. The club used the house to provide safe and affordable housing for Black women and girls who did not have families to house them. The building was listed on the National Register of Historic Places in 2023.

== History ==
The Christian Industrial Club was founded in 1904 by Etta Foster Taylor, a nurse and congregant at Detroit's Second Baptist Church. The club was composed of primarily middle-class Black women from a range of Detroit churches, and was formed to promote "moral, social, spiritual and intellectual advancement" and teach domestic sciences. In 1909, at the beginning of the Great Migration, the club refocused, dedicating itself to opening a home for young Black women. This was particularly important in Detroit at the time, as young women from the South were moving to the city, often alone, and were often subject to sexual harassment and exploitation.

The club began fundraising, and in 1915 purchased the house at 307 Horton and opened it as the Frances Harper Inn, named after prominent Black abolitionist and educator Frances Ellen Watkins Harper. The house was originally constructed in about 1893 for Detroit business owner Henry James Leonard and his wife Lyeshee. The house was auctioned in 1907; subsequent owners were Dora and Miles Dukes, and Alfred Anderson. By 1915, the block was mostly rental houses, and, importantly, was primarily White: the house was located just west of Brush Street, the unofficial western boundary of Black neighborhoods. This likely led to the reported vandalism in 1915, where three Ks were painted in the outside walls.

Two boarders lived at the Frances Harper Inn in 1915, six in 1917, and ten in 1920. The women worked as domestics or in the service industry, and some started their own businesses in hairdressing, manicuring, and the like. Throughout the 1920s, the inn housed between five and ten residents. In 1930, the Christian Industrial Club paid off the mortgage on the house. However, with the advent of the Great Depression, fewer residents stayed at the inn, with only three recorded in 1931–1934 and 1937. However, the Club continued on, remaining active through at least 1955. However, the house was sold in 1963.

The house was subsequently abandoned, and is now owned by the Michigan Urban Farming Initiative, which operates an urban farm on lots to the east and north of the building. The Michigan Urban Farming Initiative has begun to stabilize the property beautifying the grounds and replacing the windows.

== Description ==
The Frances Harper Inn is a wooden two-and-a-half story Queen Anne house with a cross gabled roof. It sits on a stone foundation. The main body of the house is clad in clapboard, with asphalt shingles on the roof. The front of the house has a projecting front gable with decorative block carving and brackets on the eaves, and vertical stickwork and fishscale shingles in the gable. A single story porch runs across the front. Under the porch is a recessed entry door and a large double hung window. A pair of double hung windows are on the second floor and small paired windows are at the attic level.
