= CJWF-FM =

Radio station in Windsor, Ontario

Coordinates: 42°10′15″N 82°59′29″W

- Windsor, Ontario; Canada
- Broadcast area: Essex Country
- Frequency: 95.9 MHz (FM)
- Branding: Windsor's Big Country 95.9 & 92.7

Programming
- Language: English
- Format: Country

Ownership
- Owner: Blackburn Radio
- Sister stations: CFCO, CKUE-FM, CHYR-FM, CJSP-FM

History
- First air date: November 16, 2009

Technical information
- Class: B1
- ERP: 3.064 kWs average 11.8 kWs peak
- HAAT: 145 metres (476 ft)
- Repeater: CJSP-FM 92.7 MHz

Links
- Webcast: Listen Live
- Website: bigcountrywindsor.com

CJWF-FM, branded as Windsor's Big Country 95.9 & 92.7, is a Windsor, Ontario radio station owned and operated by Blackburn Radio. CJWF broadcasts a country format at 95.9 FM, with limited simulcasting in Leamington, Ontario at 92.7FM.

== History ==
=== Windsor's FM/Country 95-9 ===
Logo used from 2009 to 2010

CJWF was licensed on May 9, 2008. The station began test broadcasts on the night of September 22, 2009 in the wake of 106.7 The Fox flipping from country to rhythmic adult contemporary, along with appeals for the reporting of technical problems with reception. The station officially launched on the morning of November 16, 2009 at 8am as Windsor's FM 95.9. The first song played was "Welcome to the Future" by Brad Paisley.

On September 7, 2010, the station rebranded itself as "Country 95.9, The Motor Cities Country". Later that month on September 22, 2010, the state began broadcasting station information, which can be seen on Radio Data System-enabled radios. From November 26 to December 26, 2010, the station switched to an all Christmas Country format for the holidays.

On July 31, 2012, at 5 a.m., after a mass budget cut at Blackburn Radio, sister station 92.7 Max-FM dropped its variety hits format and began simulcasting with CJWF as Windsor's' Country 95.9 & 92.7.

As such, CJWF is one of two stations (the other being CFCO) heard in Detroit that plays Canadian country that is not played by stations in the United States.

On May 1, 2026, the station rebranded as Big Country 95.9 & 92.7 as well as CJSP-FM Leamington and CHOK Sarnia also changed to the Big Country branding.
