= Blytheswood, Ontario =

Blytheswood
- Location of Blytheswood in Ontario.
- Coordinates: 42°07′16″N 82°35′41″W
- Country: Canada
- Province: Ontario
- Region: Southwestern Ontario
- County: Essex
- Municipality: Leamington
- Elevation: 194 m (636 ft)
- Time zone: UTC-5 (Eastern Time Zone)
  - Summer (DST): UTC-4 (Eastern Time Zone)
- FSA: N8H
- Area codes: 519, 226

Blytheswood is a small community located in the township of Leamington (formerly Mersea), Essex County, in southwestern Ontario, Canada. The village is at the intersection of Ontario Highway 77 and Concession 8. Blytheswood's more recognized businesses are the Jones Popcorn family farm and Setterington's farm supply depot. Blytheswood and the surrounding area of Leamington are experiencing a boom in greenhouse development for agricultural products supplied to H. J. Heinz Company. The community has a population of about 50 people and the school for this area is Mount Carmel – Blytheswood Public School.
