= Sherk =

Sherk is a family name that may refer to:

- Bill Sherk, Canadian writer and journalist
- Bonnie Sherk (1945–2021), American artist
- Cathy Sherk (born 1950), former Canadian professional golfer
- Harold Sherk (1903–1974), Canadian Mennonite minister and peace activist
- Jerry Sherk (born 1948), former American football defensive tackle
- Joël Scherk (1946–1980), French theoretical physicist
- Sean Sherk (born 1973), American mixed martial arts fighter
- Stephanie Sherk (1976-2019), former partner of Mexican actor Demián Bichir
