= CKSY-FM =

Radio station in Chatham-Kent, Ontario

Coordinates: 42°26′14″N 82°06′22″W

- Chatham-Kent, Ontario; Canada
- Broadcast area: Southwestern Ontario
- Frequency: 94.3 MHz
- Branding: 94.3 CKSY

Programming
- Format: Adult contemporary Christmas music (Nov-Dec)
- Affiliations: Premiere Networks

Ownership
- Owner: Blackburn Radio
- Sister stations: CFCO-FM; CKUE-FM

History
- First air date: July 1, 1986
- Former frequencies: 95.1 MHz (1986–2002)

Technical information
- Class: B
- ERP: 50,000 watts
- HAAT: 135.3 metres (444 ft)

Links
- Webcast: Listen live
- Website: cksyfm.com

CKSY-FM (94.3 MHz) is a commercial radio station in Chatham-Kent, Ontario. Owned by Blackburn Radio, it broadcasts an adult contemporary format for Southwestern Ontario. CKSY is co-owned with classic rock station CKUE-FM and country station CFCO-FM.

CKSY-FM has an effective radiated power (ERP) of 50,000 watts. Its transmitter is on Fairview Line at Harwich Road in the Harwich section of Chatham.

== History ==
CKSY-FM's logo from 2006

CKSY signed on the air on July 1, 1986. It originally broadcast on 95.1 FM, which had previously been the frequency used by CBEE-FM, a rebroadcaster of CBC Radio One station CBE in Windsor, now at 88.1 FM. CKSY aired easy listening music branded as Cosy, which evolved into a soft adult contemporary format by the mid-1990s.

On May 4, 2002, CKSY switched frequencies with sister station CKUE, relocating to its current frequency of 94.3 FM. In 2005, CKSY and CKUE were acquired by Blackburn Radio.

By 2010, the station had dropped much of its older-skewing and softer titles from its playlist. It adopted a brighter, more contemporary music mix, while remaining within the boundaries of the AC format. In 2014, sister station CKUE-FM discontinued its active rock sound for a soft AC format. It later shifted to a classic rock format as Cool FM.
