= Wally Tatomir =

American ice hockey equipment manager (died 2022)

Wally Tatomir (c. 1946 – September 18, 2022) was a Canadian-born American equipment manager for the Carolina Hurricanes of the National Hockey League. He held four patents on ice hockey equipment. He announced his retirement on June 6, 2012.

== Hockey career ==
Tatomir worked with ice hockey equipment for over 30 years. He spent many years in the Ontario Hockey League with the Windsor Spitfires and the Detroit Junior Red Wings. He was the head equipment manager for the Canadian National Junior Team at the infamous 1987 World Championship. In the NHL, he previously worked as an equipment consultant for the Los Angeles Kings and the Detroit Red Wings. He joined the Carolina Hurricanes (the then Hartford Whalers) in 1994. He won the Stanley Cup with the Hurricanes as head equipment manager for the 2005–06 NHL season.

== Patents ==
Tatomir had four patents, three of which deal with skates. Two pieces of equipment help precisely sharpen skates. They measure the angle of deviation for skate blades. He also invented a tool that eliminates scratches, bumps, and holes in the blade which may affect player performance. His last patent on a piece traded as "Eze-Out". It is an extractor tool which helps remove broken stick blades from non-wooden shafts, which include aluminium, graphite, kevlar and composite shafts. He also founded a company which deals with this tool.

== Personal life and death ==
Tatomir was born in Leamington, Ontario. For many years he lived in Raleigh, North Carolina, with his wife Constance. He died in Boone on September 18, 2022, at the age of 76.
