= Mount Carmel – Blytheswood Public School =

Location
- 622 Mersea Road 5 Leamington, Ontario, N8H 3V5; Canada; 42°05′03″N 82°36′00″W

Information
- School type: Public, Elementary school
- Founded: 2002
- Superintendent: Paul Antaya
- Area trustee: Dave Taves
- School number: 376035
- Principal: Ms.Pike
- Secretary: Kim Iaquinta
- Staff: 25
- Grades: JK–8
- Enrollment: 302 (September 2008)
- Language: English
- Area: Blytheswood, Mount Carmel
- Colours: Blue, White
- Mascot: Shark
- Team name: MCB Sharks
- Website: www.gecdsb.on.ca/schools/elem/mtcarmelblyth/index.html

Mount Carmel – Blytheswood Public School is an elementary school in the north end of Leamington, Ontario, Canada. It is part of the Greater Essex County District School Board and serves students from JK to Grade 8 from the communities of Blytheswood and Mount Carmel and surrounding areas. The amalgamated Mount Carmel-Blytheswood Public School first operated in the academic year 2002–2003 with the opening of an addition, completed in the fall of 2002, which more than doubled the size of the school.

Enrollment is 302 students. The majority speak English, and 30% are from Mennonite backgrounds who speak Low German at home.

A Learning Support Program, computer lab and resource library assist teachers in meeting the curricular needs of all students. Co-curricular and extra-curricular activities including school teams, house league programs and various clubs.
