= CKUE-FM =

Radio station in Chatham-Kent, Ontario

Coordinates: 42°26′14″N 82°06′22″W

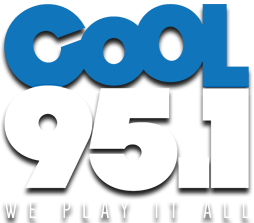
- Chatham-Kent, Ontario; Canada
- Broadcast area: Chatham-Kent; Essex County; Windsor
- Frequency: 95.1 MHz
- Branding: 95.1/100.7 Cool FM

Programming
- Language: English
- Format: Classic hits

Ownership
- Owner: Blackburn Radio
- Sister stations: CKSY-FM; CFCO-FM

History
- First air date: October 6, 1999
- Former frequencies: 94.3 MHz (1999–2002)

Technical information
- Class: B (CKUE-FM); B1 (CKUE-FM-1)
- ERP: 42,000 watts (CKUE-FM); 3,840 watts average, 9,000 watts peak (CKUE-FM1)
- HAAT: 133.5 meters (438 ft) (CKUE-FM); 74.5 meters (244 ft) (CKUE-FM-1)
- Repeater: CKUE-FM-1 100.7 Windsor

Links
- Webcast: Listen Live
- Website: chatham.coolradio.ca

CKUE-FM is a radio station located in Chatham-Kent, Ontario. Owned by Blackburn Radio, the station broadcasts a classic hits format under the name 95.1/100.7 Cool FM. The station broadcasts on 95.1 MHz, and operates a rebroadcaster serving the nearby Windsor market, CKUE-FM-1, on 100.7 MHz.

CKUE's main signal is broadcast from a transmitter tower a few kilometres west of the community of Chatham, Ontario, with an effective radiated power of 42,000 watts.

== History ==
=== The Rock (1999–2014) ===
CKUE's former logo as "The Rock", used in variations since 2002

The station began operations on October 6, 1999 under the ownership of Bea-Ver Communications, broadcasting an active rock format on 94.3 FM. On May 4, 2002, CKUE switched frequencies with its sister station CKSY-FM to obtain its current frequency of 95.1 FM.

CKUE began operating a synchronized on-channel rebroadcaster serving the nearby Windsor market, CKUE-FM-1, in March 2004 from an antenna mounted on the top of the 26-floor Solidarity Tower Co-Op apartment building on the city's east end. In 2005, Blackburn Radio acquired CKUE along with sister station CKSY-FM. In September 2006, the Canadian Radio-television and Telecommunications Commission (CRTC) approved an application by Blackburn to move the Windsor signal from 95.1 to 100.7 MHz. This change allowed the Windsor and Chatham transmitters to increase their transmitter power.

During the 2004-2005, and 2005-2006 seasons of the Ontario Hockey League, 95.1 provided live coverage of Windsor Spitfires games, with Shadd Dales on play-by-play and Brendan McGuire on colour. They returned to CKLW in 2006.

=== LiteFM (2014–2015) ===
On January 30, 2014, at 6 p.m., CKUE-FM ended its active rock format and switched to soft adult contemporary, branded as LiteFM. Station management cited increased competition from Detroit based stations as reasoning for the change.

=== Cool FM (2015–present) ===
On April 16, 2015, at 10 a.m., CKUE-FM flipped again, this time to variety hits as Cool FM; Blackburn Radio's general manager Walter Ploegman stated that the "Lite" format was characterized by listeners as being "too soft and sleepy", and that the new format would be targeted to a middle-aged adult demographic that is "on the go, active, and looking for fun".

In 2016, a new low-powered FM station began testing in nearby Ferndale, Michigan, also on 100.7 MHz. Named WFCB-LP, the station broadcasts with just 100 watts at 81 feet above the ground, and may be subject to interference from CKUE-FM-1, due to its vastly higher power (3,840 watts average/9,000 peak), and the fact that its antenna atop Solidarity Tower is adjacent to the Detroit River, and therefore, only a few hundred feet from the Canada–United States border (which sits in the middle of the river).

In the summer of 2018, the "Cool" format was modified from variety hits to a more rock-oriented classic hits format. The station now uses the tagline "Great Hits and Real Classics" rather than "We Play it All".
