= Saint Rita Apartments =

- U.S. National Register of Historic Places
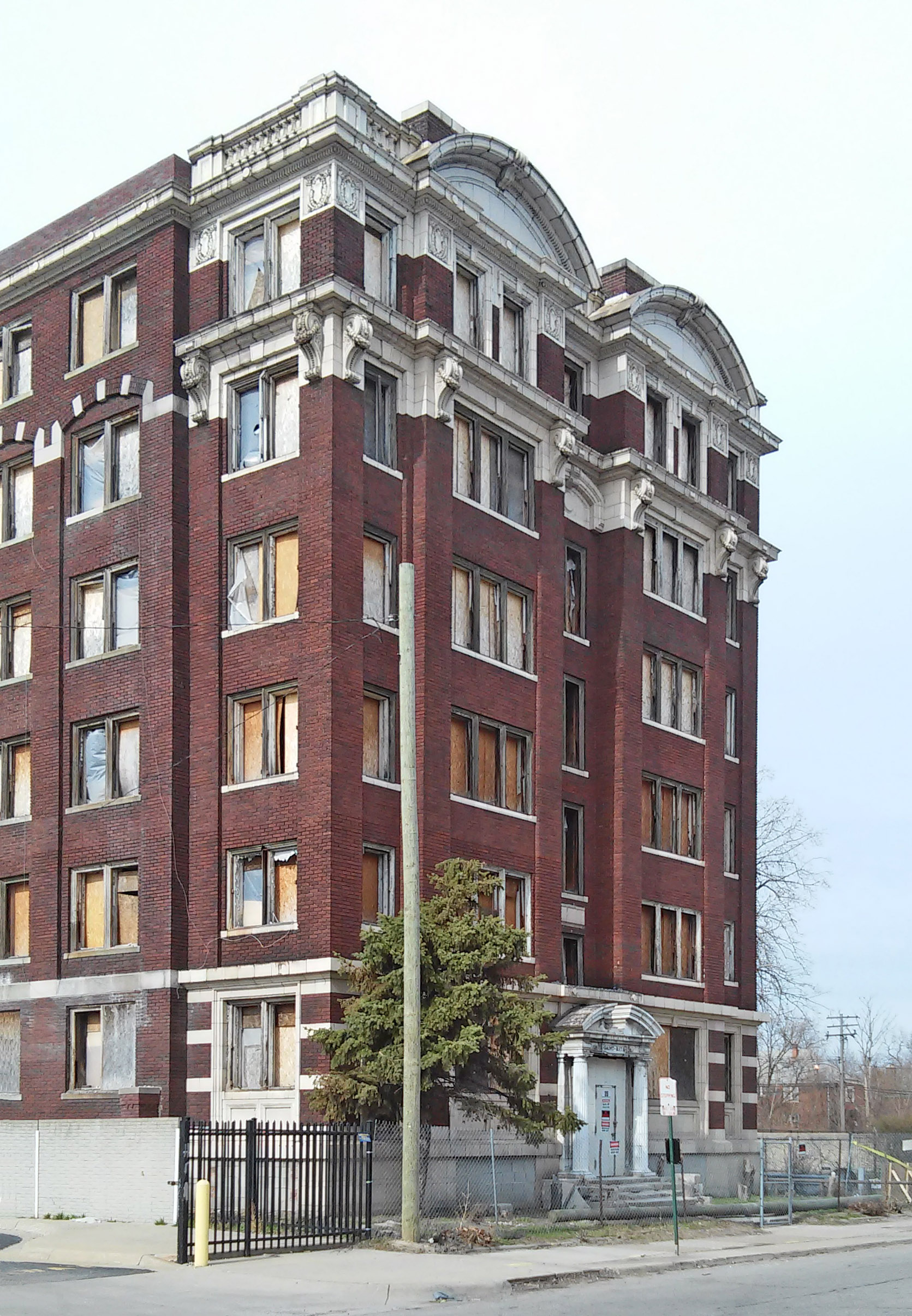
- Saint Rita Apartments, 2017

- Location within Michigan Location within the United States
- Interactive map
- Location: 35 Owen St. Detroit, Michigan
- Coordinates: 42°23′0″N 83°4′52″W
- Area: less than one acre
- Built: 1916
- Architectural style: English Renaissance Revival
- NRHP reference No.: 100000749
- Added to NRHP: March 13, 2017

The Saint Rita Apartments is an apartment building located at 35 Owen Street in the North End, of Detroit, Michigan. It was listed on the National Register of Historic Places in 2017.

== Description ==
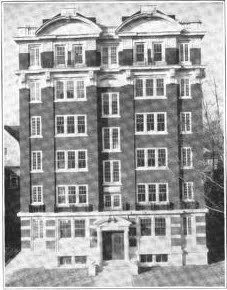
Saint Rita Apartments c 1918

The Saint Rita Apartments is a six-story English Renaissance Revival red brick apartment building. The exterior has extensive terra cotta detail work. The terra cotta ornamentation is most noticeable at the roofline.

On the interior, the lobby features ornate plaster detail and complex designs, including a portrait of two dancers and the name "SAINT RITA" above the entrance. When constructed, the Saint Rita contained 24 apartments of four or five room each.

== History ==
The Saint Rita Apartments were constructed in 1916. When constructed, the building contained 24 luxury apartments. The building was designed by Harry Stevensen and owned by Robert S. Brown.

By 1990, the apartment building had been converted into subsidized housing. The building closed in 2005, and shortly thereafter a fire damaged the interior. In 2008, it was placed on the demolition list by the city. In 2011 it was sold at auction.

In September 2017, Central City Integrated Health Inc., broke ground on a $7 million housing development for homeless veterans on the city's North End. Plans are to renovated the building into 26 units of "Permanent Supportive Housing". Permanent Supportive Housing combines affordable housing, health care, and supportive services to help individuals and families lead stable lives. The project is planned for completion by late 2018.

On February 27, 2019, The Saint Rita Apartments reopened.

== See also ==
- National Register of Historic Places listings in Detroit
