= The Detroit Partnership =

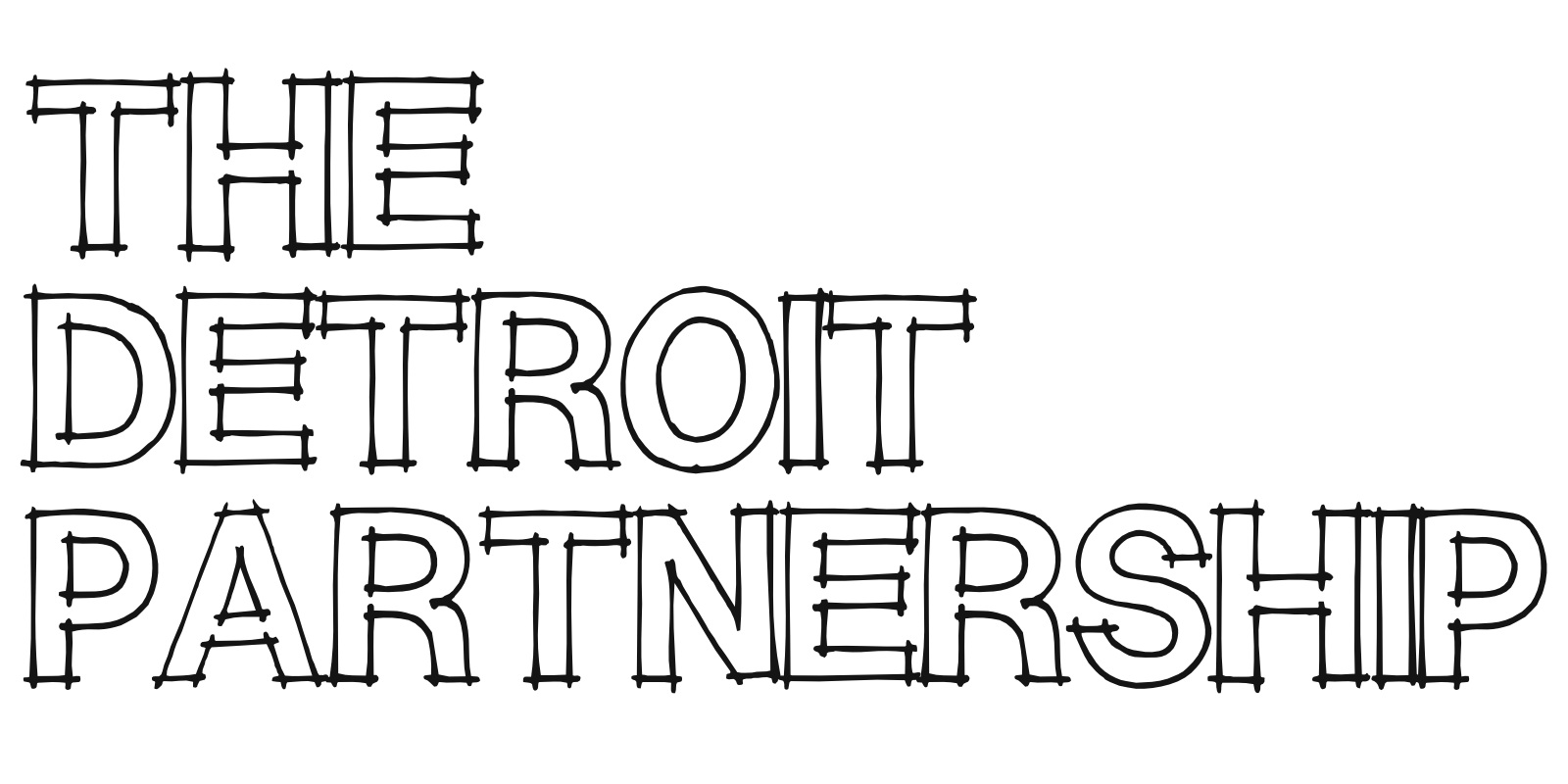
- The Detroit Partnership logo
- Formation: 1999
- Founder: Katie Foley
- Location: Ann Arbor, Michigan
- Region served: Detroit, Michigan
- Executive Director: Lynn Chen
- Website: TheDetroitPartnership.org

The Detroit Partnership (DP), known as The Detroit Project until 2008, is a student-run organization at the University of Michigan with the mission of connecting the Ann Arbor and Detroit communities through active service-learning. Each year, the group holds weekly programs with over 200 students volunteering as tutors and mentors in schools, churches, and non-profits in the Brightmoor, East Side, and Southwest neighborhoods of Detroit. In addition to weekly service-learning programs, the organization also holds two large events. In the fall, The Detroit Partnership partners with community members to bring a large food and clothing drive titled One-Stop Shop to the citizens of Brightmoor and surrounding areas. Also, every March or April, the group routinely brings approximately 1300 student volunteers from the University of Michigan to sites in and around the city of Detroit for a one-day service-learning event known as DP Day.

== History ==
=== Founding ===
The original DP logo

The Detroit Partnership, known as The Detroit Project until February 2008, began in 1999 as an annual community service event. The day of service was named Detroit Project Day and took place on April 8, 2000. Since then, the group has grown significantly and has successfully transformed from a single annual community service event into one of the largest organizations at the University of Michigan with nearly 1,500 total volunteers participating each year in various service projects with Detroit community organizations.

The initial idea for The Detroit Project is credited to Katie Foley, who was at the time a junior at the University of Michigan and the President of Circle K, an organization on campus dedicated to service, friendship and leadership. From her experiences in Circle K, Katie saw a lack of opportunity for UM students to participate in community service projects with the nearby Detroit community, and, along with fellow UM student Sara Rowe, met with numerous Detroit community organizations to develop projects and events that would be most beneficial to both the Detroit community and UM students.

The organization began its work in the Brightmoor neighborhood of northwest Detroit, an area known both for its strong community network and largely impoverished conditions.

A DP Day clean-up/demolition site.

Thus, the first DP Day, held on April 8, 2000, saw over 400 UM volunteers work at 32 different sites in Brightmoor planting trees and grass seed, cleaning parks, and demolishing abandoned homes, among other projects. In time for the 2000-2001 academic year, The then-Detroit Project retained Katie Foley as a returning Senior, and recruited a leadership team capable of growing the organization.

=== Expansion and Renaissance ===
The DP, as it became known in Ann Arbor, steadily grew in its second year. Several smaller 'one-time events', similar to DP Day in many ways, were carried out throughout the year. Still, however, the focus remained on the large service day. The second DP Day, in March 2001, had over 1400 students register and is still considered the largest ever.

By 2004, The Detroit Project had grown to include weekly volunteering efforts involving over 20 programs and 100-150 volunteers - metrics the organization has maintained through 2010. In Brightmoor, DP programs expanded into more organizations and made several lasting and special relationships. This led to The DP's inclusion into an enduring neighborhood coalition called the Brightmoor Alliance.

One such important relationship was with Pastor Albert Rush at the West Outer Drive United Methodist Church (WODUMC). In 2005, Pastor Rush partnered with The DP for the first time to hold the 1st Annual One-Stop Shop at his Church. This, The DP's second large-scale event, entails the collection of food and clothing in both Ann Arbor and Detroit, extensive effort at organization and sorting of the donated goods, and, finally, the set-up of a department store "atmosphere" in the basement of WODUMC. On the day of the event, interested community members are offered a personal shopper as an aide navigating the aisles.

Having established the model for service-learning partnerships in Brightmoor, the Detroit Partnership expanded its efforts into Southwest Detroit in 2004. Since then, the DP has built partnerships with a number of community organizations and schools in the neighborhood, with current service projects specific to the area include adult education, ESL, and work on immigration issues. In 2006, DP Day included sites in this neighborhood for the first time.

After years of success The DP evolved as an organization, and many of its student leaders felt unfulfilled with the specific nature of much of the organization's original language and vision (first in 2006, earlier by various individuals). Thus, on February 20, 2008, The Detroit Project officially changed its name to The Detroit Partnership to better reflect the organization's movement from an organization concentrated on one-sided service events (such as DP Day, where volunteers went en masse to work on projects to which they have never returned) to the development of programs and service learning through more intimate, and longer-lasting community partnerships (i.e. weekly programs). This shift did not mean an abandonment of large-scale service projects or DP Day, however, it did encourage a new frame and focus on most of the group's events. Ultimately, from the perspective of a student volunteer, this focus encouraged education and self-reflection throughout continual commitment (see Service Learning Ideology below).

By 2013, the Detroit Partnership consistently provides over 30 weekly service-learning programs with approximately 230 weekly volunteers.

=== Recent ===
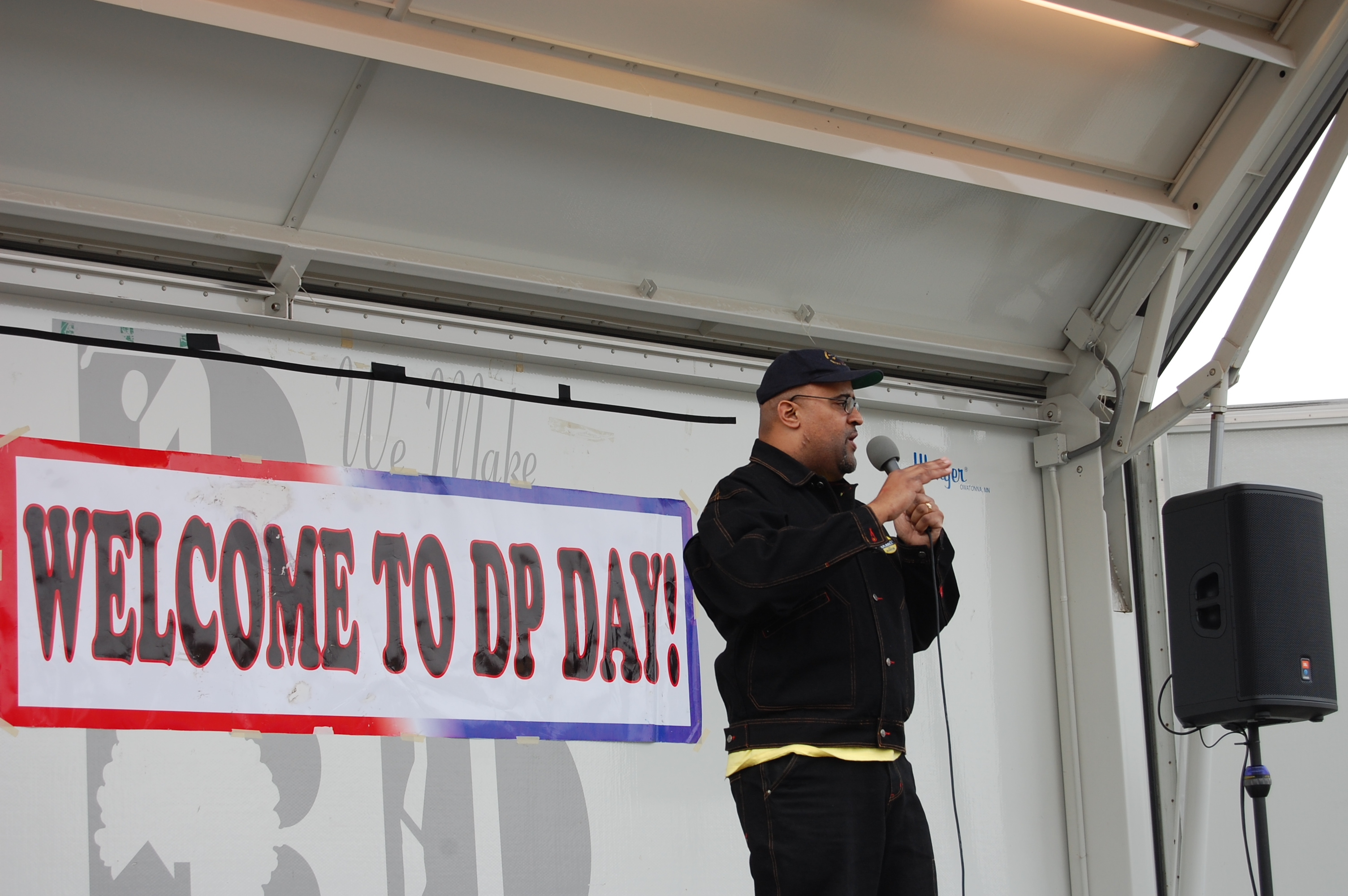
Detroit Mayor Ken Cockrel speaking at the 10th annual DP Day

The Detroit Partnership's 10th annual DP Day took place on March 28, 2009. Over 1000 volunteers from three Universities (University of Michigan, Michigan State University, and Wayne State University), over 30 community organizations, and the surrounding neighborhoods joined together to participate in service-learning projects. The keynote speaker at the DP Day 2009 rally was Detroit Mayor Kenneth Cockrel, Jr.

On April 3, 2010, the second-largest DP Day (per registered volunteers) to date occurred. 1248 individuals volunteered for the event, including individuals representing Wayne State University and several Ann Arbor High Schools. The keynote speaker for the DP Day 2010 rally was to be John Conyers Jr., the longtime representative of Michigan's 14th congressional district in the United States House of Representatives. Unfortunately, due to dangerous weather conditions, DP Day 2010's outdoor rally was cancelled and Congressman Conyers was not able to speak.

Weekly Programs have continued in full force with roughly 150 to 200 volunteers making it to Detroit each week. A related initiative, a DP-wide Education Team, was fully functioning by 2007. This section of the organization (see others under organization), champions Education efforts on the University's campus. Activities facilitated by the Ed Team often include seminar speakers, discussion chats, and food expos to name a few.

The Detroit Partnership is currently approved for government-recognized, non-profit, 501(c)3 status.

DP Day 2013 took place on March 23, 2013; DP Day 2014 took place on March 29, 2014. The speakers at the latter year's rally included Lloyd Carr.

In May 2013, the organization added an Eastside team to its weekly programs. Its first programs will run in the Fall 2013 term.

DP Day 2015 took place on March 28.

== Mission statement ==
On February 24, 2010, The Detroit Partnership's official mission statement was amended to include the ideals of multiculturalism and social justice. This represented an additional shift in the organization's philosophy and kept in line with The DP's recent renaissance attitude, especially with the official adoption of a social justice theme. Changes were made to the mission statement again in 2015. The current mission statement reads as follows:

"We, The Detroit Partnership, seek to unite the University of Michigan and Detroit by working alongside community partners in the city. As a student-run, registered 501(c)(3) non-profit organization, we strive to raise awareness, challenge stereotypes, and promote social justice through our service-learning programs and educational events."

== Service learning ideology ==
As stated in the mission statement, The Detroit Partnership believes strongly in the virtues of service learning. There is no one definition to service learning, however, it is best described as service work combined with an intentional education component.

The Detroit Partnership's focus entails:

- Establishing and maintaining partnerships with organizations in Detroit, in order to develop structured opportunities for DP members to serve in a variety of capacities.
- Reciprocal and meaningful relationships with organizations and individuals in Detroit.
- An opportunity at educational and personal growth by giving DP members' proper context for their service. Our education includes various subjects including Detroit history, sociological concepts, current events, urban issues, and effective methods of change.
- Providing an environment that encourages members to reflect on their service in order to further assess their experience. Reflection facilitates self-discovery, encourages thoughtful questions, and challenges patterns of thinking and stereotypes.

According to The Detroit Partnership's interpretation of these ideologies, the combination of the above goals will result in effective service learning that best serves their partner organizations and university members alike. From a volunteer participant's perspective, the organization maintains that the growth and benefit of DP members should ideally be a byproduct of their service - not the motivation behind their efforts - in order to truly achieve the benefits of service learning.

== Leadership ==
=== Organization ===
The Detroit Partnership currently comprises eight teams. Each team has a director in charge of that area's organization and duties. The DP as a whole is led by an executive director who is charged with being the face of the organization both on campus and in the community.

Teams are normally composed of between 6-8 members in addition to their director. Collectively, the seven teams create the larger Planning Team of around 50 members. The Planning Team meets once-a-week and works towards the large-scale goals of the organization. All individuals that give their time in The DP programs at some point throughout the year are considered volunteers.

=== List of Executive Directors ===
- 1999–2001: Katie Foley
- 2001–2002: Sandeep Jani
- 2002–2003: Catie Baetens
- 2003–2004: Jonathan Gleicher
- 2004–2005: Evan Major
- 2005–2006: Jignesha Patel
- 2006–2007: Cristina Johnson
- 2007–2008: Tom Szczesny
- 2008–2009: Ashley Fotieo
- 2009–2010: Neil Thanedar
- 2010–2011: Andrew Bahena
- 2011–2012: Cassie Basler
- 2012–2013: Kristin Beharry
- 2013–2014: Samantha Edwards
- 2014–2015: Talia Gerstle
- 2015–2016: Alyssa Setting
- 2016–2017: Jamie Bahoura
- 2017–2018: Amol Carvalho
- 2018–2019: Kevin Sweitzer
- 2019–2020: Lynn Chen

== Community partners ==
Currently, the DP partners with the following schools and organizations:

The DP continues to evolve by partnering with community organizations and K-12 schools that share the same passion for the city of Detroit.

- The Brightmoor Alliance
- West Outer Drive United Methodist Church
- Cesar Chavez Middle School
- Gompers Elementary School
- Burt Elementary School
- Webster Elementary School
- Neinas Elementary School
- Murphy Middle School
- Vetal Elementary School
- Harding Elementary School
- Brightmoor Community Center
- Grandmont/Rosedale Development Corporation
- Greening of Detroit

Students and community members perform a clean sweep and paint a mural at Artist Village.

- Michigan Urban Farming Initiative
- Motor City Blight Busters
- Northwest Detroit Neighborhood Development, Inc.
- Trinity Development Center
- Wellspring Center
- Latin American for Social and Economic Development (LA SED)
- Alternatives for Girls
- Shurly Family Learning Center
- St. Christine Christian Services
- St. Vincent Sarah Fisher Center
- Village of Shiny Stars
- Public Art Workz
- All Saints Neighborhood Center
- Woodbridge Community Center
- Resource Community Development Corporation

== Notable DP Day speakers ==
- Kwame Kilpatrick, then mayor of Detroit
- Kenneth Cockrel, Jr., then mayor of Detroit
- Lloyd Carr, former Michigan football coach
- Mark Schlissel, president of the University of Michigan

== Awards and honors (2000–10) ==
Community Service Award - Center for Campus Involvement

- Awarded in 2014

Ally Award - Center for Campus Involvement"

- Awarded in 2013

Ginsberg Center (at The University of Michigan) Outstanding Community Impact Award

- Awarded in 2010

University of Michigan Outstanding Student Organization Award

- Awarded in 2001, 2002, 2003, 2004, 2005, 2009

University of Michigan Program of the Year: Detroit Project Day

- Awarded in 2001, 2004, 2007, 2008, 2011

Michigan State Legislature - Special Tribute

- Awarded to the Detroit Project on April 25, 2007 by Michigan Governor Jennifer Granholm and State Representative Gabe Leland

LeaderShape Palmer Award and Scholarship, 2000

- Awarded to Katie Foley for founding DP

Circle K International First Place Single Service Award

- Awarded to Detroit Project Day
