= CFGX-FM =

Radio station in Sarnia, Ontario

Coordinates: 42°52′09″N 82°23′38″W

- Sarnia, Ontario; Canada
- Broadcast area: Lambton County, Ontario; St. Clair County, Michigan
- Frequency: 99.9 MHz
- Branding: 99.9 The Fox

Programming
- Format: Adult Top 40
- Affiliations: Premiere Networks

Ownership
- Owner: Blackburn Radio
- Sister stations: CHKS-FM, CHOK

History
- First air date: September 14, 1981
- Former call signs: CJFI (1981–1988)
- Call sign meaning: similar to "Fox"

Technical information
- Class: B
- ERP: 26,000 watts
- HAAT: 76 metres (249 ft)

Links
- Website: foxfm.com

CFGX-FM is a Canadian radio station, which broadcasts at 99.9 FM in Sarnia, Ontario. The station broadcasts an adult top 40 format with the brand name The Fox and slogan Today's Best Music.

CFGX-FM can be heard in the eastern parts of Michigan as far west as Lapeer and well into the Thumb region, and used to have a listenable signal in much of Macomb County before Detroit's WCHB (now WMUZ) signed on an FM translator at 99.9 (which now relays WDMK-HD2). The station can be heard as far east as Strathroy (farther east, co-channel CHJX-FM in London interferes) and Chatham to the south.

== History ==
The station was launched with the call sign CJFI on September 14, 1981, by Rogers Communications, the owner of the city's existing CKJD. CJFI featured easy listening music with some simulcasting of Top 40-formatted CKJD overnights. The station adopted its current call sign and format on February 26, 1988.

CKJD and CJFI were sold to Maclean-Hunter subsidiary Blue Water Broadcasting on July 16, 1987. When Rogers acquired Maclean-Hunter on December 19, 1994, the Blue Water stations were spun off to Blackburn Radio.

In July 2008, the station applied to increase power. That application was approved on September 3, 2008.

In 2014, the format of the station migrated from adult contemporary as "Light Hits" to "Today's Best Music" with an adult top 40 format. The shift to a younger format put CFGX into closer competition with Port Huron-based hot AC station WBTI rather than American mainstream AC station WGRT. CFGX is an affiliate of Ryan Seacrest's American Top 40 countdown show.
