= CHYR-FM =

Radio station in Leamington, Ontario

Coordinates: 42°08′01″N 82°45′45″W

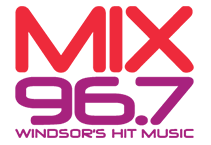
- Leamington, Ontario; Canada
- Broadcast area: Southwestern Ontario
- Frequency: 96.7 MHz
- Branding: Mix 96.7

Programming
- Format: Hot adult contemporary

Ownership
- Owner: Blackburn Radio

History
- First air date: 1955
- Former call signs: CJSP (1955–1967); CHYR (daytime 1967-1993); CHIR (nighttime 1967-1974); CHYR-7 (nighttime 1974-1993)
- Former frequencies: 710 kHz (1955–1993) (daytime frequency); 730 kHz (1967–1993) (nighttime frequency)

Technical information
- Class: C1
- ERP: 10,000 watts
- HAAT: 152.9 metres (502 ft)

Links
- Website: mix967.ca

CHYR-FM (96.7 MHz, Mix 96.7) is a commercial radio station in Leamington, Ontario, Canada, serving the Southwestern Ontario market. It is owned by Blackburn Radio and airs a hot adult contemporary format branded as Mix 96.7. The station competes with cross-border station WDVD in Detroit.

== History ==
=== 710AM CJSP, Cheer Radio ===
The station was launched in 1955 by Sun Parlor Broadcasting at 710 AM, as a daytimer with a 250-watt transmitter, using the callsign CJSP. The principal shareholders in Sun Parlour Broadcasting were Al Bruner, John Garton Sr., Lou Tomasi and Art Gadd. The station increased its power to 1,000 watts in 1960. The "SP" in the call sign stood for "Sun Parlour," a nickname for the Leamington/southern Essex County region of Ontario. CJSP was a small-town station typical of its era with a variety of programming including a Top 40 show; the station distributed a record survey called "The Fascinatin' Fifty" in that era.

In late 1967, the station adopted its current callsign, and received approval from the CRTC to broadcast at nighttime; due to clear channel rules to protect New York's WOR, the station remained on 710 during the day, but shifted to 730 at night. The switch in frequency was called fine tuning time, and was accompanied by a Lou Tomasi voiced 60-second audio bed series of varying-pitched beeps which helped the listener re-tune (hopefully) to the station where they would be told "you're back on the beam with Cheer Radio". The nighttime station also used a different callsign, CHIR, but retained the same Cheer branding. During its years of operation on two frequencies, the station had two licenses, one for each call sign. In 1968, the station was sold to Rogers Communications, although Sun Parlour Broadcasting continued to operate as a separate subsidiary.

As "Channel Seven, Cheer Radio," CHYR/CHIR aired a very contemporary and upbeat MOR music format bordering on Top 40, an approach that might be today considered Hot AC. In the mid-1970s, they started to spell out the daytime call letters on-air "C-H-Y-R" as well as use the phrase "Super Seven Cheer" and variations with a new Pepper/Tanner jingle package (reportedly as a light poke at the "Big 8" just up the road in Windsor), but overall the format approach and on-air policy was always "bright, tight, brief and real!"

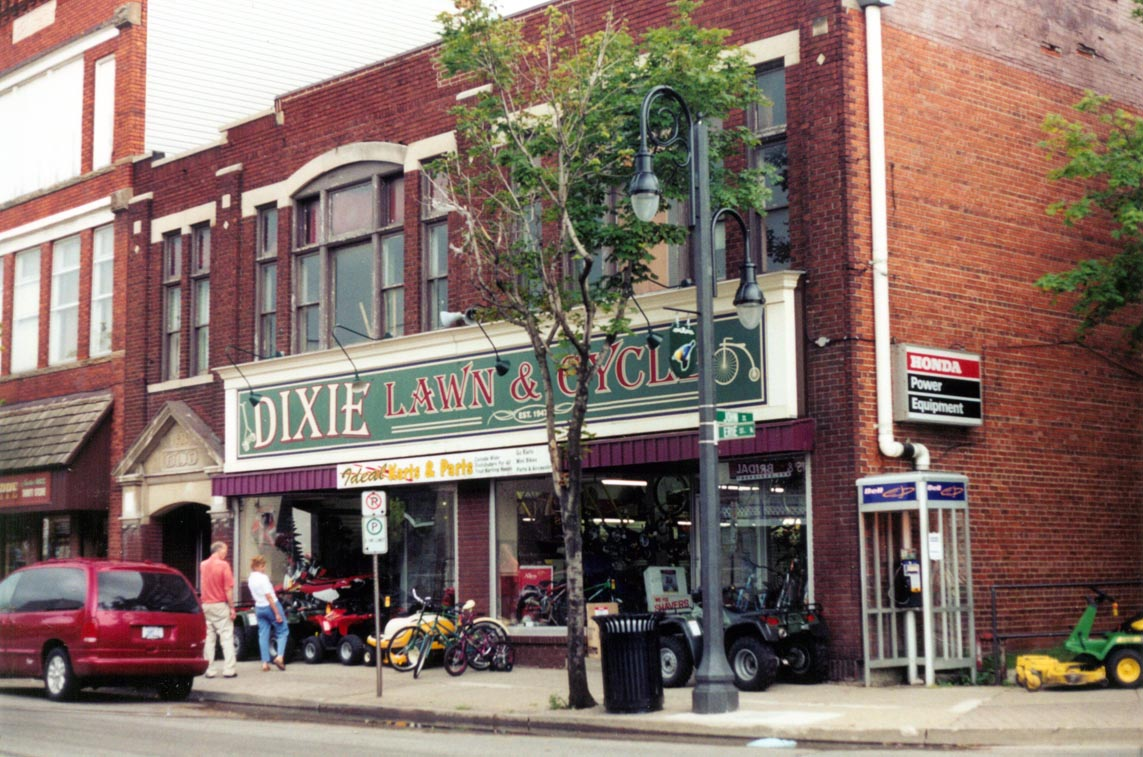
Original Studios, 23 Erie St. N (top floor)

In 1974, the "CHIR" calls were quietly abandoned, and the nighttime transmitter's call sign instead became CHYR-7. The station increased its nighttime power from 250 to 500 watts that year. In 1975, Keith Dancy acquired Sun Parlour Broadcasting from Rogers, although two years later he sold the station back to Rogers, along with CKJD in Sarnia, in exchange for CHIQ in Hamilton. In 1987, the station's ownership was spun off to Blue Water Broadcasting, a subsidiary of Maclean-Hunter.

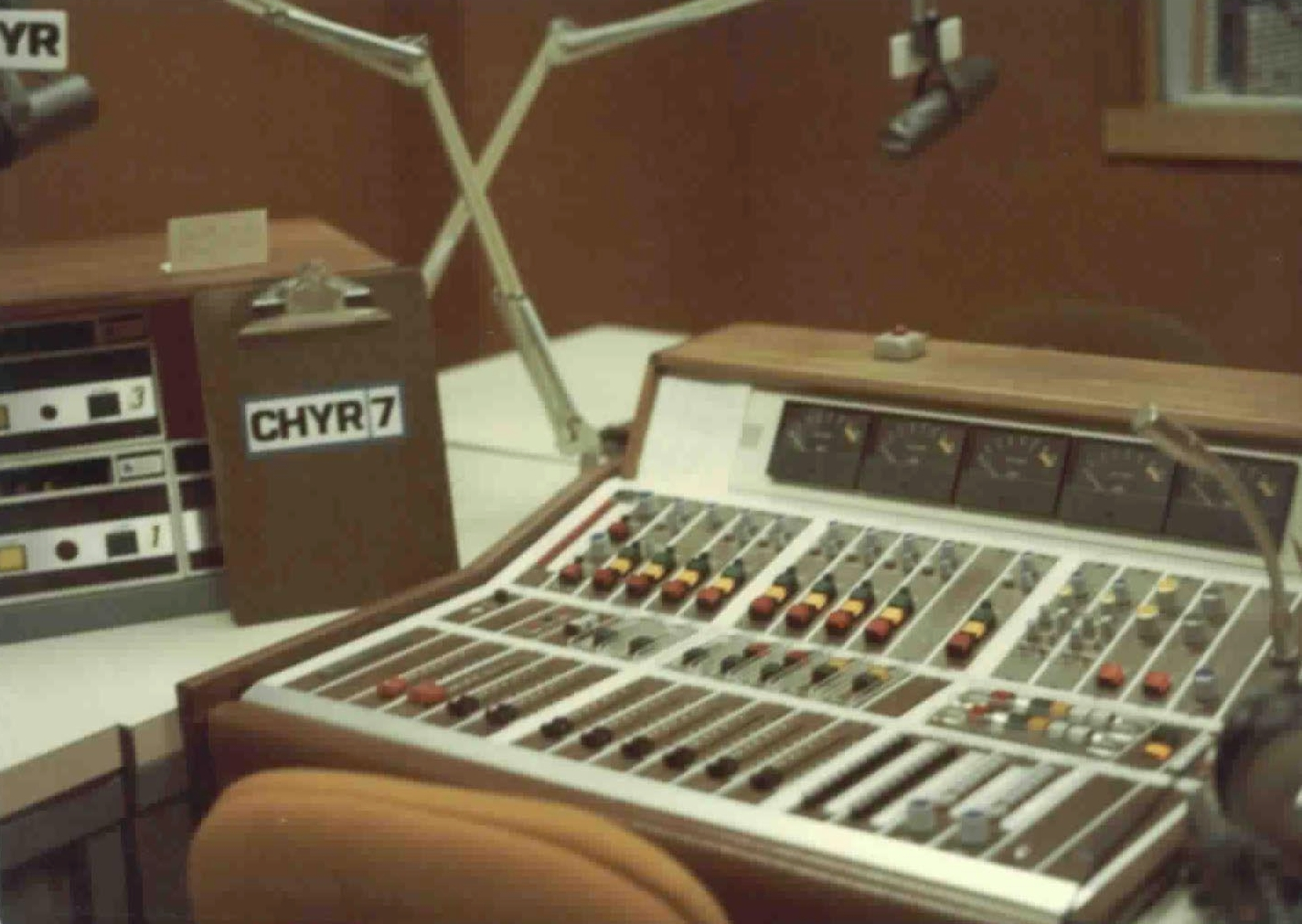
Combo announcer/news configuration, Talbot St. Studios, mid 1970s

=== CHYR Country, move to FM ===
Four years later, the station dropped its longtime adult contemporary sound for a country format, citing listener demand for Canadian country music as an impetus for the change.

In 1993, the station received CRTC approval to move to FM. In preparation for the move, most of the AM transmitter towers had to be demolished to make room for the new FM tower; as a result, the 730 frequency was abandoned and the station operated full-time at reduced power on 710 for a few months. The move to FM was completed in July of that year. After a brief period of simulcasting, CHYR ceased operations on 710 kHz at 6 p.m. on September 10, 1993. In 1994, Maclean-Hunter was acquired by Rogers, and The Blue Water Group was sold to Blackburn Radio.

=== 96.7 Cheer-FM (2001–2008) ===
Cheer-FM logo (2001–2008)

On April 22, 2001, the station abruptly dropped its country format after 10 years and flipped to Hot AC branded as 96.7 Cheer-FM, reviving the heritage "Cheer" name. Market vet Tim O'Neill took over mornings and Corey Robertson arrived in late 2001 for afternoons.

On January 3, 2007, CHYR moved its broadcast tower from just outside Point Pelee to a new tower in Cottam, making the signal available to over 70 thousand more homes.

=== Mix 96.7 (2008–present) ===
Former logo used from 2008–2015

On March 3, 2008, the station rebranded as Mix 96.7.

In 2016, a low-power community FM station at 96.7, WNUC-LP. signed from the New Center neighbourhood of Detroit, Michigan, which reduced CHYR's reach in Detroit, along with some interference between the two stations within Windsor's city centre.
