= CJSP-FM =

Radio station in Leamington, Ontario

Coordinates: 42°00′35″N 82°33′45″W

- Leamington, Ontario; Canada
- Broadcast area: Southwestern Ontario
- Frequency: 92.7 MHz
- Branding: Windsor's Big Country 95.9 & 92.7

Programming
- Format: Country

Ownership
- Owner: Blackburn Radio
- Sister stations: CHYR-FM

History
- First air date: March 3, 2008
- Call sign meaning: Sun Parlour (nickname for the Leamington region of Ontario)

Technical information
- Class: B1
- ERP: vertical polarization: 955 watts average 3,400 watts peak horizontal polarization: 960 watts average 4,000 watts peak
- HAAT: 144.5 metres (474 ft)

Links
- Website: bigcountrywindsor.com

CJSP-FM (92.7 FM, Windsor's Big Country 95.9 & 92.7) is a Canadian radio station, which broadcasts at 92.7 MHz in Leamington, Ontario. CJSP is owned and operated by Blackburn Radio. The station features a country format and simulcasts its morning show from sister station CJWF-FM in Windsor.

== History ==
Country 92.7 CJSP Logo 2008-2011

92-7 Max-FM Logo 2011-2012

=== Country 92.7 CJSP/Max-FM (2008–2012) ===
The station was given approval by the Canadian Radio-television and Telecommunications Commission on July 9, 2007. On November 27, 2007, the station signed on and went into testing mode. On March 3, 2008 at 9 a.m., CJSP ended their testing mode and officially launched as Country 92.7 CJSP and became a full-service FM station. The station featured Southwestern Ontario radio vet Cordell Green in mornings and Randy Reeves as its imaging voice.

At midnight on January 4, 2011, "Country 92.7 CJSP" came to an end and was replaced with variety hits 92-7 Max-FM, a similar format to now defunct 93.1 Doug-FM in nearby Detroit. All personalities were dropped from the lineup, with the exception morning hosts Cordell Green and Laura Carney. The rest of the day remained automated.

=== Country 95.9 & 92.7 (2012–Present) ===
On July 31, 2012 at 5am, after a mass budget cut at Blackburn Radio, CJSP dropped its variety hits format and began simulcasting CJWF-FM in Windsor as Country 95.9 & 92.7. Station host Cordell Green remained with the station as Program Director and host of the morning show before moving to afternoons in 2019.

On May 1, 2026, the station rebranded as Big Country 95.9 & 92.7 as well as CJWF-FM Windsor and CHOK Sarnia also changed to the Big Country branding.
