= Bill Sherk =

Canadian writer and journalist

Bill Sherk is a Canadian writer and journalist and is an authority on old cars. He predominantly writes books and articles on old cars and the stories behind them and their owners. He currently lives in Leamington, Ontario, Canada.

== Works ==
- 60 Years Behind the Wheel: Cars We Drove in Canada, 1900-1960 - 2003
- 500 Years of New Words: The Fascinating Story of How, Why, and When Hundreds of Your Favourite Words Entered the English Language - 2004
- I'll Never Forget My First Car: Stories From Behind the Wheel - 2005
