= Blackburn Radio =

Canadian broadcasting group

Blackburn Radio, Inc.
- Type: Private
- Industry: Media
- Headquarters: London, Ontario
- Key people: Richard Costley-White (former President/CEO)
- Products: Radio broadcasting
- Website: www.blackburnmedia.ca

Blackburn Radio, Inc. is a Canadian radio broadcasting group, which owns several radio stations in Southwestern Ontario. Headquartered in London, Ontario, the company is owned by 2061302 Ontario Limited, which is majority owned by Cogent Investments.

The three Chatham stations were previously owned by Webster and Bea-Ver Communications, which was acquired by Blackburn Radio in April 2005.

In 2006, during CRTC hearings reviewing commercial radio policy in Canada, Blackburn requested that all of its radio stations on or near the U.S. border be permitted to reduce their Canadian content requirement to 20 per cent. CHUM Limited's radio stations in Windsor have been granted this special exemption, due to competition from the Metro Detroit media market, and Blackburn has stated that all of its stations in the region face similar competitive challenges.

== Stations ==
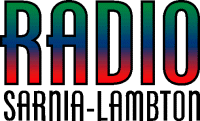
Radio Sarnia-Lambton

- Chatham-Kent - CFCO-FM, CKSY-FM, CKUE-FM
- Leamington - CHYR-FM, CJSP-FM
- London - CKLO-FM
- Sarnia - CHOK, CFGX-FM, CHKS-FM
- Windsor - CJWF-FM, CKUE-FM-1
- Wingham - CKNX, CKNX-FM, CIBU-FM

== Formerly-owned stations ==
- CFPL-TV, CKNX-TV (sold to Baton Broadcasting in 1993)
- CFPL, CFPL-FM, CFHK-FM (sold to Corus Entertainment in 1999)
