= CHOK =

Radio station in Sarnia, Ontario

- Sarnia, Ontario; Canada
- Broadcast area: Lambton County, Ontario; St. Clair County, Michigan
- Frequency: 1070 kHz
- Branding: Big Country 103.9

Programming
- Format: Country music
- Affiliations: Sarnia Sting; Toronto Blue Jays Radio Network

Ownership
- Owner: Blackburn Radio
- Sister stations: CHKS-FM; CFGX-FM

History
- First air date: July 26, 1946

Technical information
- Licensing authority: CRTC
- Class: B
- Power: 10,000 watts
- Transmitter coordinates: 42°53′30″N 82°19′20″W
- Repeater: 103.9 CHOK-1-FM (Sarnia)

Links
- Website: bigcountry1039.com

CHOK (1070 kHz, "Big Country 103.9 FM") is a Canadian commercial radio station, licensed to Sarnia, Ontario, Canada, and owned by Blackburn Radio. The station broadcasts a country music format with local all-news radio, talk radio and sports radio. CHOK also has an FM translator, CHOK-1-FM, broadcasting on 103.9 MHz. The station is the radio home of the Toronto Blue Jays, as well as the Sarnia Sting. During Blue Jays games, CHOK's regular country music programming airs exclusively on the CHOK website.

== History ==
The station was launched on July 26, 1946, by Sarnia Broadcasting. In 1947, Sarnia Broadcasting Co. was granted a licence to operate an FM station on 97.5 MHz (as CHOK-FM), which left the air sometime between 1948 and 1953, after being damaged from the Sarnia tornado. That station was never rebuilt. It was acquired by IWC Communications, a corporate precursor of Standard Broadcasting, in 1970, and went through a variety of sales to local owners until being acquired by its current owner, Blackburn Radio, in 1998. Blackburn also owns both of the city's other commercial radio stations, CFGX-FM and CHKS-FM.

=== CHOK-1-FM and technical information ===
Rebroadcasters of CHOK
City of licence	Identifier	Frequency	Power	Class	RECNet	CRTC Decision
Sarnia	CHOK-1-FM	103.9	200 watts	A1	Query	2008-10

In April 2007, CHOK applied to add an FM transmitter (CHOK-1-FM) at Sarnia to broadcast at 103.3 MHz and simulcast the programming of CHOK, due to AM reception problems from metal and steel associated with the operations from petrochemical plants. Another company, Points Eagle Radio, had applied at the same time to use the 103.3 MHz frequency to broadcast Aboriginal programing. Points Eagle Radio was given approval by the CRTC to use the 103.3 FM frequency on August 7, 2007.

On July 20, 2007, CHOK was given approval in part to broadcast at 100.9 MHz. On October 10, Blackburn Radio applied to use the frequency 103.9 MHz instead. On January 18, 2008, CHOK was given approval to use the 103.9 frequency with 200 watts power.

CHOK began testing of its 103.9 FM transmitter atop the Kenwick Building in downtown Sarnia, on June 18. On the morning of July 23, CHOK signed on as Country 103.9 FM and would continue to simulcast its signal on 1070 AM.

The station also has a low-power license-exempt repeater on 101.5 FM at the Progressive Auto Sales Arena. The 101.5 FM frequency is reserved for use by the CBC, should they choose to broadcast on that frequency in the future.

== CHOK formats and brandings ==
Over the years, CHOK aired a number of formats such as oldies, news/talk, country music and others.

In May 2013, CHOK changed from country music to a classic hits/hot adult contemporary format. On December 26, 2019, country music returned to CHOK in Sarnia.

On May 1, 2026, the station rebranded as Big Country 103.9 as well as CJSP-FM Leamington and CJWF-FM Windsor also changed to the Big Country branding.
