= North End, Detroit =

Coordinates: 42.3693°N 83.077°W

- Cultural enclave and neighborhoods
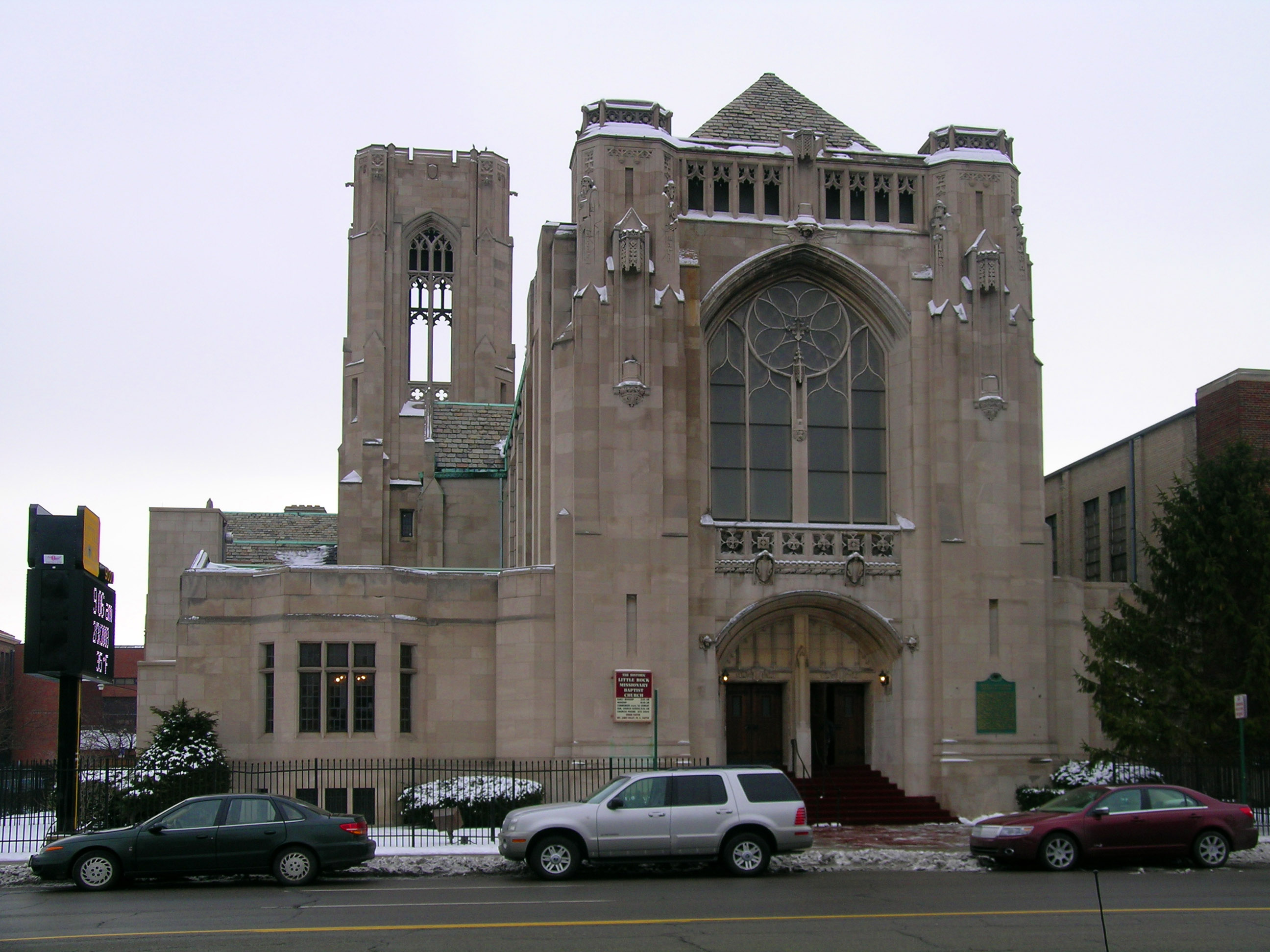
- Little Rock Baptist Church (formerly Central Woodward Church), a historic building on the western boundary of the North End
- Interactive map of North End, Detroit
- Country: United States
- State: Michigan
- County: Wayne
- City: Detroit
- Time zone: UTC-5 (Eastern Standard Time (North America))
  - Summer (DST): UTC-4 (Eastern Daylight Time (North America))

The North End is a neighborhood located in Detroit, Michigan. It is located in the Woodward Corridor, a densely populated region along Woodward Avenue that stretches from Downtown Detroit to the suburb of Highland Park. The North End has been home to several development initiatives, seen by many as an area for future development extending north from Downtown and Midtown.

The North End is approximately bound by East Grand Boulevard to the south, Woodward Avenue to the west, bordering New Center; the City of Hamtramck to the east; and Woodland street to the north, bordering Tennyson street in Highland Park.

== History ==
The North End was originally part of Hamtramck Township but was annexed by the City of Detroit in 1891. It received its name due to it being the "north end" of Paradise Valley. Along with the rest of Detroit, it experienced a cultural and economic boom in the 1920s and 1930s due to the success of the automotive industry, and the district continued to experience growth. Many Motown musicians lived in the North End, including Smokey Robinson, Diana Ross, the Four Tops, and Aretha Franklin.

The neighborhood began to see an economic downturn in the 1950s. I-75 was built in 1959, dividing the North End from the city center and also destroying the African American neighborhoods of Paradise Valley and Black Bottom. Marygrove College professor Frank D. Rashid has noted that Detroit's vibrant entertainment district Paradise Valley had eventually stretched as far as the North End.

== Demographics and education ==
According to 2000 census data, the North End was home to some 17,500 residents, a 16% decrease in population since 1990. Approximately 94% of this population was African American, 4% white, and some 1% multiracial. The average household income rate for the North End in 2000 was $33,360, below the Detroit average of $40,837.

The North End is in the Detroit Public Schools district. 2000 census data showed that over 32% of the population did not have a high school diploma, slightly above the Detroit average.

== Development initiatives ==
In 1994, the Vanguard Community Development Corporation was founded to improve the North End's prospects. The area has since become the site of increasing development.

In 2006, the North End was chosen as one of six target areas for $100m funding from The Skillman Foundation, a grantmaking charitable body that focuses on improving the lives of Detroit's children. Its ten-year Good Neighborhoods program provides funding to an area defined as Northend Central, which includes the adjoining New Center area within the targeted neighborhood.

In 2011, the North End Neighborhood Investment Strategy was launched as a three-year partnership between Vanguard and the Woodward Corridor Initiative. This public-private partnership has attracted widespread support, including from the City of Detroit, Wayne State University, The Kresge Foundation, and the Skillman Foundation, and aims to create investment within the community, improve education and employment choices, create affordable housing and remove barriers to economic development within the neighborhood. Other organizations contributing to development of the North End include the North End Youth Improvement Council (NEYIC, founded by community activist Delores Bennett), North End Woodward Community Coalition (NEWCC), and the Central Detroit Christian Community Development Corporation (CDC).

On March 14, 2016, the Michigan Humane Society opened its new and expanded $15.5 million animal care campus on five acres, including a 35,000 square foot, state-of-the-art veterinary facility, located just east of New Center at 7887 Chrysler Drive near Clay Street. The society said the larger facility will enable it to expand its teaching and training opportunities with Michigan State University’s College of Veterinary Medicine.

On November 11, 2016, the Michigan Urban Farming Initiative (MUFI) announced its plans to implement the first sustainable urban "agrihood" in the United States. This plan is an extension of the community development work the nonprofit has been doing in the lower North End since 2011 in which MUFI's existing agricultural campus is positioned as the centerpiece of a larger mixed-use development (with a focus on residential). The first of its kind in the country, MUFI's sustainable urban agrihood is a model for its mission to use urban agriculture as a platform to promote education, sustainability and community in an effort to uplift and empower urban neighborhoods, solve social problems, and develop a broader model for redevelopment.

== See also ==
- Milwaukee Junction
- Woodward Corridor
- Saint Rita Apartments
