= Leamington, Ontario =

Town in Ontario, Canada

Leamington
- Municipality (lower-tier)
- Municipality of Leamington
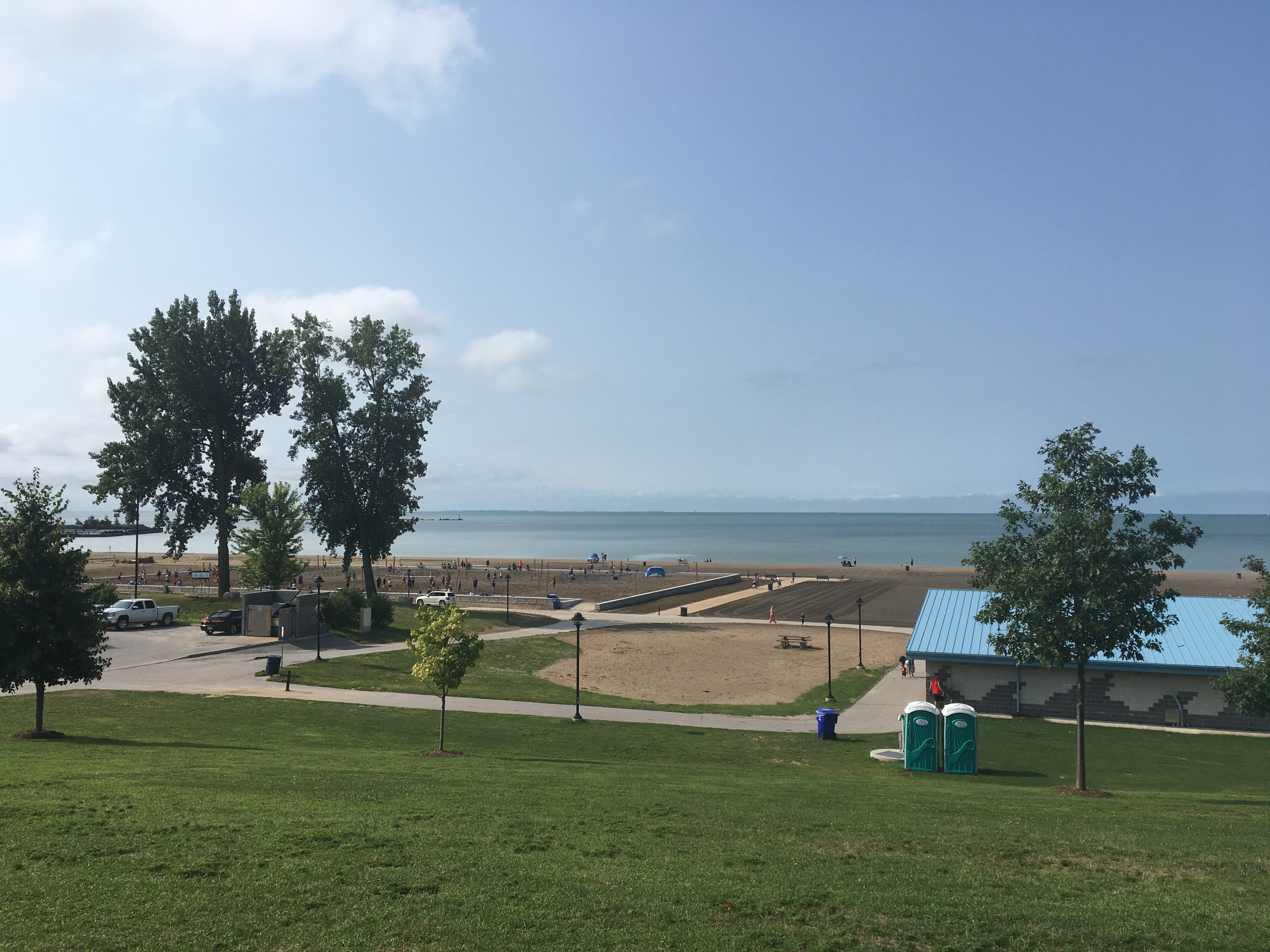
- Lake Erie and Seacliff Park

- Flag Logo
- Nicknames: The Sun Parlour of Canada, The Tomato Capital of Canada
- Motto: Live | Play | Work
- Location within Essex County Location within Southern Ontario
- Coordinates: 42°4′N 82°35′W
- Country: Canada
- Province: Ontario
- County: Essex

Government
  - Mayor: Hilda MacDonald
  - MP: Dave Epp (CPC)
  - MPP: Trevor Jones (PC)

Area
  - Land: 261.24 km^{2} (100.87 sq mi)
  - Urban: 31.77 km^{2} (12.27 sq mi)

Population (2021)
  - Municipality (lower-tier): 29,680
  - Density: 113.6/km^{2} (294/sq mi)
  - Urban: 35,730
  - Urban density: 1,124.7/km^{2} (2,913/sq mi)
- Time zone: UTC-5 (EST)
  - Summer (DST): UTC-4 (EDT)
- Forward sortation area: N8H
- Area codes: 519, 226, 548
- Website: www.leamington.ca

Leamington (/ˈliːmɪŋtən/ LEEM-ing-tən) is a municipality in Essex County, Ontario, Canada. With a population of 29,680 in the Canada 2021 Census, it forms the second largest urban centre in Windsor-Essex County after Windsor, Ontario.

Known since the 20th century as the "Tomato Capital of Canada", it is the location of a tomato processing plant owned by Highbury-Canco; founded in 1908, the plant was owned until 2014 by the H. J. Heinz Company. Due to its location in the southernmost part of Canada, Leamington uses the motto "Sun Parlour of Canada". The Heinz factory in Leamington closed in 2014 after more than 100 years of operation.

== History ==
Leamington was incorporated as a village in 1874, but by 1869, the European-Canadian settlement already had a population of 350. The community was named after Royal Leamington Spa in England, after having originally been called "Gainesville" or "Gainesborough" for local mill owner William Gaines, and before that, Wilkinson Corners. It has had a post office since June 1854.

It was a crossroads hamlet with about 300 residents and was first known for its lumber products rather than tomatoes. There was extensive lumbering in western Ontario, as across the river in Michigan and also upper Michigan. There were several docks, and fish were plentiful in Lake Erie, so much so that sturgeon could be speared from the shore and fish was the cheapest food available.

Leamington was a "sundown town," a place where Black people would face violence or harassment if they were in public after dark. In 1930, a group of Black parishioners on a visit to Seacliff Park were ordered to leave Leamington by several town administrators. David Suzuki attests that he was told, upon arrival in Leamington in 1946, that "no colored person has ever stayed here beyond sunset."

Leamington was also one of the few Canadian municipalities included in the Negro Motorist Green Book, the American publication listing safe businesses for travelling black people.

On January 1, 1999, the town was amalgamated with the surrounding Township of Mersea to form an expanded Town of Leamington. Similar municipal restructuring took place throughout Essex County.

In the early hours of June 6, 2010, an F1 tornado ripped through portions of southern Essex County, stretching from Harrow, through Kingsville, to southern Leamington before dissipating near Point Pelee National Park, creating considerable damage, but no loss of life or any direct injuries. The tornado passed through Leamington, damaging various important landmarks and facilities in town, including the marina.

== Geography ==
Besides the town of Leamington itself, the municipality of Leamington comprises a number of villages and hamlets, including Albuna, Blytheswood, Cherry Lane Estates, Elmdale, Goldsmith, Marentette Beach, Mount Carmel, Oakland, Seacliffe, Wigle, Windfall, Chalmers, Erie Curve, Hillman, Point Pelee and Sturgeon Woods.

=== Climate ===
Leamington lies on the 42nd Parallel, the same latitude as Chicago, Boston, the northern border of California, Rome, and Zaragoza. It is located on the north shore of Lake Erie, which acts to moderate its climate.

Climate data for Leamington, Ontario (1951–1980, extremes 1906–present (Note: Long term records have been recorded at various climate stations in or nearby Leamington since 1906))
Month	Jan	Feb	Mar	Apr	May	Jun	Jul	Aug	Sep	Oct	Nov	Dec	Year
Record high °C (°F)	16.7 (62.1)	18.3 (64.9)	26.7 (80.1)	29.4 (84.9)	35.0 (95.0)	37.5 (99.5)	40.0 (104.0)	37.8 (100.0)	36.1 (97.0)	29.4 (84.9)	23.3 (73.9)	18.0 (64.4)	40.0 (104.0)
Mean daily maximum °C (°F)	−1.4 (29.5)	−0.2 (31.6)	4.4 (39.9)	12.0 (53.6)	18.5 (65.3)	24.0 (75.2)	26.4 (79.5)	25.5 (77.9)	22.0 (71.6)	15.5 (59.9)	7.6 (45.7)	1.1 (34.0)	13.0 (55.4)
Daily mean °C (°F)	−4.4 (24.1)	−3.3 (26.1)	1.0 (33.8)	7.7 (45.9)	13.9 (57.0)	19.7 (67.5)	22.3 (72.1)	21.5 (70.7)	17.9 (64.2)	11.8 (53.2)	4.7 (40.5)	−1.6 (29.1)	9.3 (48.7)
Mean daily minimum °C (°F)	−7.4 (18.7)	−6.5 (20.3)	−2.4 (27.7)	3.4 (38.1)	9.3 (48.7)	15.3 (59.5)	18.0 (64.4)	17.4 (63.3)	13.8 (56.8)	8.0 (46.4)	1.8 (35.2)	−4.3 (24.3)	5.5 (41.9)
Record low °C (°F)	−29 (−20)	−31.7 (−25.1)	−22.2 (−8.0)	−13 (9)	−7.8 (18.0)	−1.1 (30.0)	2.2 (36.0)	1.7 (35.1)	−2.2 (28.0)	−12.2 (10.0)	−16.1 (3.0)	−27.2 (−17.0)	−31.7 (−25.1)
Average precipitation mm (inches)	57.7 (2.27)	53.0 (2.09)	69.1 (2.72)	80.1 (3.15)	67.8 (2.67)	83.4 (3.28)	77.5 (3.05)	71.0 (2.80)	64.4 (2.54)	52.2 (2.06)	67.0 (2.64)	73.1 (2.88)	816.3 (32.14)
Average rainfall mm (inches)	32.9 (1.30)	29.9 (1.18)	49.7 (1.96)	76.4 (3.01)	67.8 (2.67)	83.4 (3.28)	77.5 (3.05)	71.0 (2.80)	64.4 (2.54)	52.1 (2.05)	59.2 (2.33)	47.4 (1.87)	711.7 (28.02)
Average snowfall cm (inches)	24.7 (9.7)	23.0 (9.1)	19.4 (7.6)	3.6 (1.4)	0.0 (0.0)	0.0 (0.0)	0.0 (0.0)	0.0 (0.0)	0.0 (0.0)	0.1 (0.0)	7.9 (3.1)	25.7 (10.1)	104.4 (41.1)
Average precipitation days (≥ 0.2 mm)	12	10	13	12	11	10	9	9	9	9	11	13	128
Average rainy days (≥ 0.2 mm)	5	4	8	11	11	10	9	9	9	9	9	7	101
Average snowy days (≥ 0.2 cm)	9	7	7	1	0	0	0	0	0	0	3	8	35
Source: Environment Canada

== Demographics ==
Historical populations
Year	Pop.	±%
1871	200	—
1881	1,910	+855.0%
1901	2,451	+28.3%
1911	2,652	+8.2%
1921	3,675	+38.6%
1931	4,902	+33.4%
1941	5,799	+18.3%
1951	6,950	+19.8%
1961	9,030	+29.9%
1971	10,435	+15.6%
1981	12,528	+20.1%
1991	14,182	+13.2%
1996	25,389	+79.0%
2001	27,138	+6.9%
2006	28,833	+6.2%
2011	28,403	−1.5%
2016	27,595	−2.8%
2021	29,680	+7.6%
1996 population reflects boundary changes made between the 1996 census and the 2001 census.

In the 2021 Census of Population conducted by Statistics Canada, Leamington had a population of 29,680 living in 10,547 of its 11,219 total private dwellings, a change of 7.6% from its 2016 population of 27,595. With a land area of 261.24 km^{2} (100.87 sq mi), it had a population density of 113.6/km^{2} (294.3/sq mi) in 2021.

Canada 2006 Census		Population	% of Total Population
Visible minority group Source:	Arab	580	2.1%
Visible minority group Source:	Black	245	0.9%
Visible minority group Source:	Chinese	145	0.5%
Visible minority group Source:	Filipino	25	0.1%
Visible minority group Source:	Japanese	40	0.1%
Visible minority group Source:	Korean	0	0%
Visible minority group Source:	Latin American	1,390	4.9%
Visible minority group Source:	South Asian	80	0.3%
Visible minority group Source:	Southeast Asian	275	1%
Visible minority group Source:	West Asian	25	0.1%
Visible minority group Source:	Other visible minority	80	0.3%
Visible minority group Source:	Mixed visible minority	25	0.1%
Total visible minority population		2,915	10.3%
Aboriginal group Source:	First Nations	160	0.6%
Aboriginal group Source:	Inuit	0	0%
Aboriginal group Source:	Métis	115	0.4%
Total Aboriginal population		305	1.1%
White		25,055	88.6%
Total population		28,275	100%

=== Language ===
The majority of people from Leamington speak English. According to the 2016 census, 24,070 speak English only, 12,100 male and 11,970 female, 1,655 people speak both English and French, 735 male and 920 female, and 1,330 people speak neither English nor French.

Residents of Leamington include a population of Lebanese, Portuguese and Italian. Mennonite settlers, whose ancestors immigrated from Russia, have also added to the population.

=== Age ===
According to the 2016 census, the average age of people living in Leamington is 41.3 years - for men the average was 39.7 and for women the average was 42.9 years of age.

=== Immigration ===
According to a 2006 survey, 7,485 are immigrants or migrants, and 19,365 people are natives of Canada. The majority of migrants come from Mexico and Jamaica, and are employed as seasonal farm workers through the Temporary foreign worker program in Canada. According to the census, Leamington had the highest percentage of Latin Americans in Canada, with 4.9%.

== Economy ==
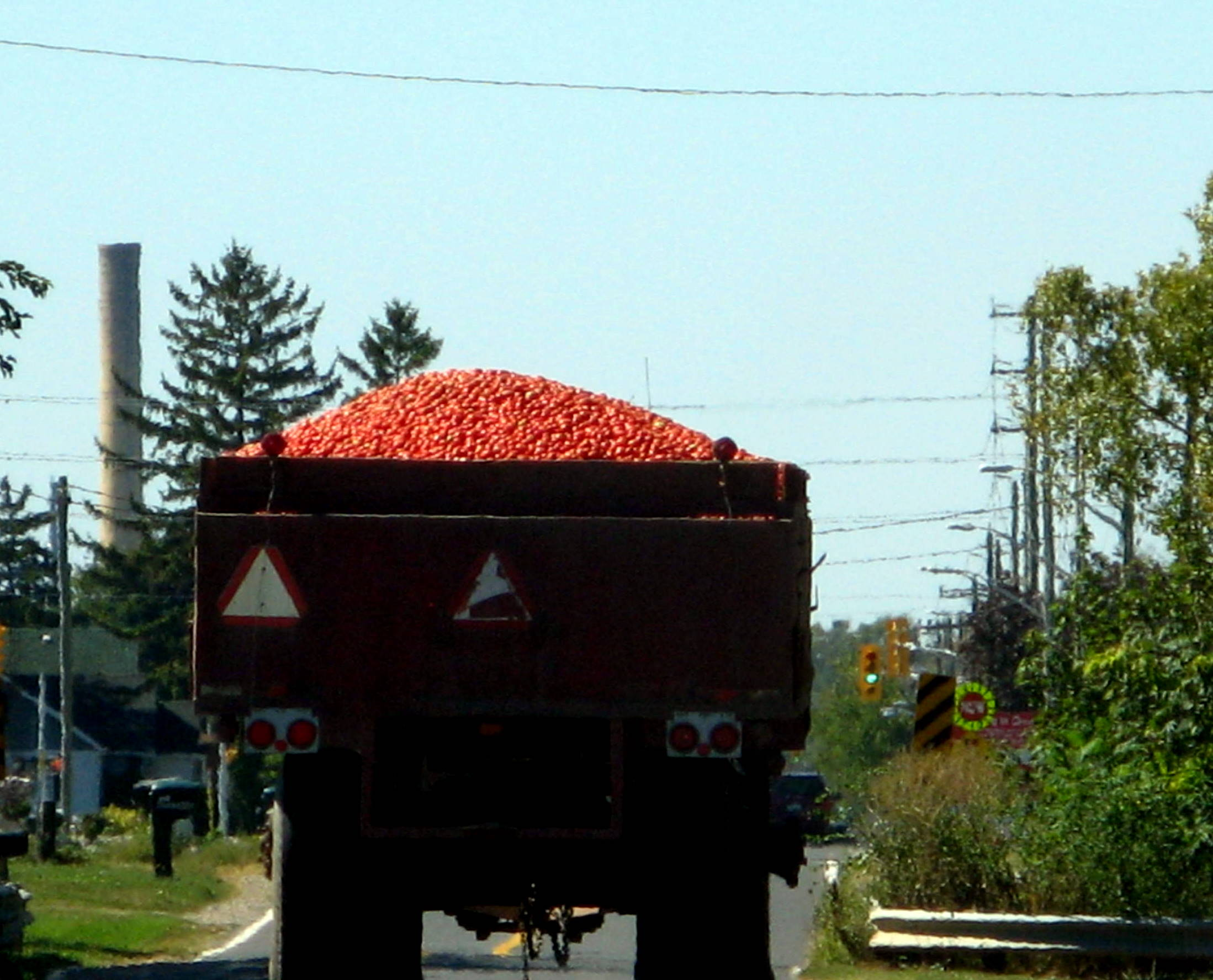
Tomatoes being transported in Leamington. The smoke stack of the former Heinz processing factory can be seen in the distance on the left.

The H. J. Heinz company established a factory in 1908 in Leamington. The Heinz products are shipped from the city with both English and French labels, mostly to the United States. Ketchup and baby food are the main products. In November 2013 Heinz announced that it would close the Leamington plant in 2014, meaning job losses for 740 employees at the plant and hundreds more support workers.

Regional and local businessmen worked to save the plant. A campaign was conducted on Facebook to raise support and funds. As a 54-year-old law in Canada bans the use of tomato paste in tomato juice, thus requiring fresh tomatoes, they arranged a deal whereby Highbury Canco took over the plant in 2014. It produces tomato juice and other products for Heinz. Around 250 workers still process canned products at the over 100-year-old factory.

Leamington has also been known for its greenhouses. It now has the largest concentration of commercial greenhouses in all of North America, with 1,969 acres (797 ha) of greenhouse vegetable production in the general area. Major products of the greenhouse industry, in addition to tomatoes, are peppers, cannabis, cucumbers, roses, and other flowers. Hydroponic farming has been very successfully adopted by many greenhouse operators in Leamington. Historically, tobacco was an important crop in the area. Tobacco production declined in the 1960s and today is virtually nonexistent.

Migrant workers, mostly Mexican and Caribbean seasonal labourers, annually arrive in the region to work in Leamington's greenhouses and farms. Several Mexican and Jamaican shops and a Mexican consulate have opened to serve the migrants.

Leamington became a production site of Aphria, one of Canada's largest medicinal and recreational marijuana greenhouse operators. A merger in December 2020 with Nanaimo, British Columbia-based Tilray, led to the closure of Tilray's production site in Leamington and operations were consolidated at the former Aphria site under the name Tilray.

=== Tourism ===
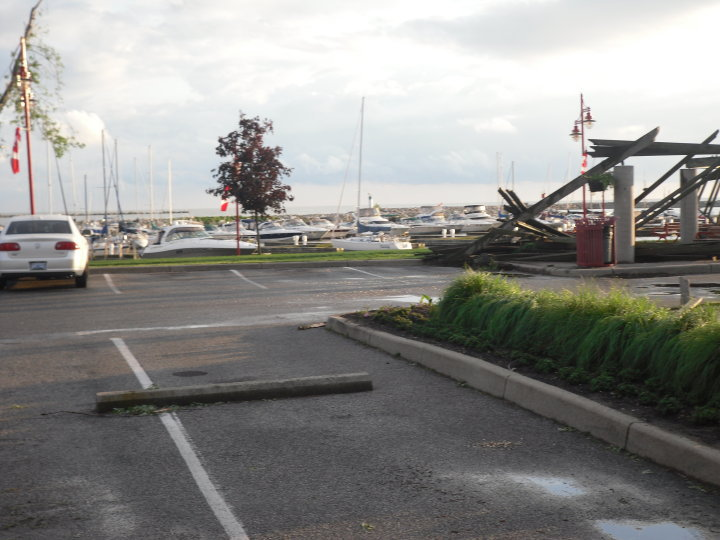
Leamington Marina damage after the tornado of June 6, 2010

Tourism contributes significantly to the economy, and the city has many attractions. Its attractions include cycle paths along the lake and the nearby Point Pelee National Park. It is a major site for migrating birds, especially in the autumn. As such, it plays host to many birdwatchers from Canada, the United States, and around the world. The region is also known for the migration of monarch butterflies, which congregate in the fall at Point Pelee before making their way across Lake Erie on their route to winter quarters in central Mexico. Another important natural area near Leamington is the wetland at Hillman Marsh, located six kilometres (3.7 mi) east of the town.

Leamington has a large marina, as many people engage in sailing and other water sports. The marina also features a promenade that extends from the Marina to the Historical Leamington Dock, a port for ferry services to Pelee Island using the Pelee Islander and Pelee Islander II.

== Arts and culture ==
=== Annual events and festivals ===
- Festival of Birds – Every year over 40,000 visitors head to Point Pelee National Park for the Festival of Birds at the beginning of May. Over 300 species of birds migrate through the park every year, providing close up views of birds not seen anywhere else in the country.
- Leamington Fair – For over 170 years, the Leamington District Agricultural Society holds the Fair, typically during the third week in June. The Fair features a Midway full of rides and games, a Demolition Derby, and a variety of contests for arts, crafts, livestock, and food in a classic county fair.
- Music Onthe42 Summer Concert Series – The Music Onthe42 Summer Concert Series that runs from late June to the end of August at the Seacliff Park Amphitheatre. Seven free concerts feature national and local bands of all genres performing Saturday evenings.
- Arts @ The Marina – The South Essex Arts Association/Leamington Arts Centre presents an Annual Outdoor Arts and Crafts Show towards the end of June at the Leamington Municipal Marina.
- Hogs For Hospice – An annual motorcycle rally usually held at the beginning of August. It is centred around Seacliff Park and includes concerts featuring music, and a weekend long craft and vendor show. Proceeds from the weekend are donated to the Leamington Hospice.

The town's water tower, visible for kilometres in the flat southern Ontario landscape, is in the shape and colour of a tomato. The former tourist information booth in the centre of town is shaped like a fibreglass tomato.

== Attractions ==
=== Parks ===
Seacliff Park

Leamington has several parks including Seacliff Park, the Marina Park, Mersea Park and Garrison Gardens, Henry Park, and Chestnut Park.

== Sports ==
- Leamington Flyers play in the Western Division of the Greater Ontario Junior Hockey League at Highbury Canco Arena
- Wheatley Sharks play in the Great Lakes Junior C Hockey League

== Infrastructure ==
=== Transportation ===
Transportation around the city is offered by the Leamington Transit bus system. The city has a small private airport located four kilometres (2.5 mi) to the east of town. The town is also connected to the provincial highway network by Highway 3 (to Windsor), and Highway 77 (to Highway 401).

A rail line that Heinz built from its plant to the harbour has been converted to a bicycle path going from the middle of town to the Marina. Two ferries, (MV Pelee Islander and MV Pelee Islander II) owned by the Owen Sound Transportation Company, run on a regularly scheduled seasonal basis from Leamington to Pelee Island with continuing service on to Sandusky, Ohio.

=== Healthcare ===
Erie Shores Healthcare serves the city of Leamington, as well as Essex and Chatham Kent. Opened in 1950, Leamington District Memorial Hospital succeeded two smaller healthcare facilities: Hopewell Hospital (c. 1933) and Cottage Hospital (c. 1920). In mid-December 2016, the hospital formally submitted notice to the Ministry of Health and Long-Term Care that it wished to change its name to Erie Shores Healthcare, and subsequently has been approved. Other major healthcare needs can be accessed in nearby Windsor, Ontario.

== Education ==
English-language public education for kindergarten through secondary school grades in Essex County is administered by the Greater Essex County District School Board, along with the Windsor-Essex Catholic District School Board which oversees English-language Catholic education.

French-language public and Catholic education are overseen by the Conseil scolaire Viamonde and the Conseil scolaire catholique Providence, respectively. The scope of all of these organizations includes both the County and the City of Windsor.

Prior to 1998, the Essex County Board of Education operated Anglophone secular public schools.

=== Elementary ===
Leamington has five public elementary schools, Margaret D. Bennie, Queen Elizabeth, Gore Hill, Mount Carmel - Blytheswood Public School and East Mersea. Leamington has two Catholic elementary schools: Cardinal Carter Middle School and Saint Louis. Leamington also has one French speaking Catholic School, St. Michel. South Shore Christian School is a private elementary school located in Leamington. Leamington has two main school boards, the Greater Essex County District School Board and the Windsor-Essex Catholic School Board.

Queen of Peace Catholic Elementary School faced closure in February 2016, but was since converted to Cardinal Carter Catholic Middle School.

Mill Street Public School was permanently closed at the conclusion of the 2016–2017 school year.

=== Secondary ===
Leamington has three secondary schools: Leamington District Secondary School (public), Cardinal Carter Catholic High School, and U.M.E.I. (United Mennonite Education Institute).

== Media ==
=== Print ===
Leamington's weekly newspaper is the Southpoint Sun-Journal. The weekly newspaper that was Leamington Post ceased operations in 2012 after 138 years in publication.

=== Radio ===
Leamington is home to two regional commercial radio stations.

Frequency	Call sign	Branding	Format	Owner	Notes
FM 91.9	CBEW-FM-1	CBC Radio One	Talk radio, public radio	Canadian Broadcasting Corporation	Rebroadcaster of CBEW-FM (Windsor)
FM 92.7	CJSP-FM	Country 95.9 & 92-7	Country music	Blackburn Radio	Simulcasts CJWF-FM (Windsor)
FM 96.7	CHYR-FM	Mix 96.7	Hot adult contemporary	Blackburn Radio	
FM 103.1	CBEF-1-FM	Ici Radio-Canada Première	Talk radio, public radio	Canadian Broadcasting Corporation	Rebroadcaster of CBEF (Windsor)

Leamington is also served by Weatheradio Canada station VAZ533, transmitting at 162.475 MHz in the weather band.

=== Television ===
OTA virtual channel (PSIP)	OTA channel	Cogeco	Call Sign	Network	Notes
22.1	33 (UHF)	3, 706	CIII-DT-22	Global	Rebroadcaster of CIII-DT-41 (Toronto)
34.1	30 (UHF)	100	CFTV-DT	Independent	Community television
34.2	30 (UHF)	–	CFTV-DT	Independent	French- and Spanish- language community television
34.3	30 (UHF)	–	CFTV-DT	Independent	First Nations community television and special needs/described video programming
34.4	30 (UHF)	–	CFTV-DT	Independent	Leamington and Essex County council meetings

== Notable people ==
- Margaret Birch (1921-2020), first female cabinet minister in the Government of Ontario
- Kirk Bowman, former NHL player
- Al Bruner (1923–1987), co-founder of Global Television network
- Stephen Eustáquio, pro soccer player
- Lana Gay, radio personality on CIND-FM, and formerly CBC Radio 3
- Hayden Hodgson, NHL player
- Bob Hooper (1922-1980), MLB pitcher
- Danny Klassen, former MLB infielder
- Randy Manery, former NHL player
- Darren McCarty, former NHL player
- Maud Leonora Menten (1879–1960), physician and chemist.
- Billy Raffoul, rock singer-songwriter
- Pat Ribble, former NHL player
- Nino Ricci, author
- Brad Selwood, former NHL player and coach
- Bill Sherk, author
- Lynsay Sands, author
- Wally Tatomir (d. 2022), former equipment manager for the NHL's Carolina Hurricanes
- Rosalie Trombley (1939-2021), music director of AM Top 40 radio station CKLW

== See also ==
- List of townships in Ontario
