= Michigan Urban Farming Initiative =

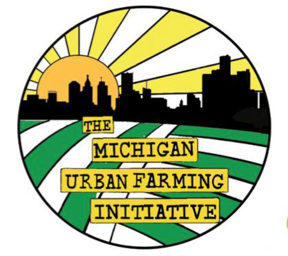
- Michigan Urban Farming Initiative logo, depicting the Detroit skyline in the background
- Formation: 2011
- Founders: Tyson Gersh; Darin McLeskey
- Legal status: 501(c)(3)
- Purpose: Urban agriculture Social justice
- Headquarters: 7432 Brush St; Detroit, MI 48202; United States
- President: Tyson Gersh
- Website: MIUFI.org

The Michigan Urban Farming Initiative (MUFI, /mʌfiː/) is a 501(c)(3) nonprofit organization in Detroit, Michigan, dedicated to urban agriculture and social justice. MUFI is based in the North End district of central Detroit, where it operates a large multipurpose site. It also has a presence in Woodward Village, a separate neighborhood in Detroit.

== History ==
Tyson Gersh and Darin McLeskey, then-students at the University of Michigan, founded the Michigan Urban Farming Initiative in 2011. They met at a meeting for The Detroit Partnership, a student group that fosters relations between the university and Detroit.

The first project for MUFI was the establishment of their main site in the North End district of central Detroit. Since its founding, most of MUFI's efforts have gone to the development of this site.

In 2012, MUFI officially registered as a 501(c)(3) nonprofit organization.

On November 11, 2016, MUFI announced its plans to implement the first sustainable urban "agrihood" in the United States. This plan is an extension of the work the nonprofit has been doing since 2011 at the North End site, in which MUFI's existing agricultural campus is positioned as the centerpiece of a larger mixed-use development, with a focus on residential. The first of its kind in the United States, MUFI's sustainable urban agrihood is a model for its mission to use urban agriculture as a platform to promote education, sustainability and community in an effort to uplift and empower urban neighborhoods, solve social problems, and develop a broader model for redevelopment.

Currently, the North End site functions primarily as an urban farm and community activity area. MUFI intends to establish a community resource center at the site in the future.
