= CHKS-FM =

Radio station in Sarnia, Ontario

- Sarnia, Ontario; Canada
- Broadcast area: Lambton County, Ontario; St. Clair County, Michigan
- Frequency: 106.3 MHz (HD Radio)
- Branding: Cool 106.3

Programming
- Format: Classic hits

Ownership
- Owner: Blackburn Radio
- Sister stations: CFGX-FM, CHOK

History
- First air date: August 3, 1968
- Former call signs: CKJD (1968–1987); CKTY (1987–1999)
- Former names: 1250 kHz (1968–1977); 1110 kHz (1987–1999)

Technical information
- Licensing authority: CRTC
- Class: B
- ERP: 35,000 watts (average); 50,000 watts (peak)
- HAAT: 124 metres (407 ft)
- Transmitter coordinates: 42°52′9″N 82°23′38″W

Links
- Webcast: Listen Live
- Website: sarnia.coolradio.ca

CHKS-FM is a Canadian radio station, which broadcasts at 106.3 FM in Sarnia, Ontario. The station broadcasts a classic hits format with the brand name Cool 106.3. In addition to Sarnia, it also serves Port Huron, Michigan.

CHKS-FM broadcasts in HD.

== Range ==
CHKS-FM can be heard in parts of Eastern Michigan, as far west as Flint, Michigan. The station conflicts with WGER of Saginaw, in Genesee and Lapeer Counties, though those with directional antennas can tune either station in these areas. The 106.3 FM signal has been heard as far south as Monroe; however, reception can be difficult due to FM translator W292DK in Oak Park which is also on 106.3 FM. This situation tends to cause interference in southern St. Clair County, as well as in Macomb County. In Ontario, interference seems minimal.

== History ==
Dancy Broadcasting launched the station in 1969, as an AM station with the callsign CKJD and a contemporary MOR format. The station's original AM frequency was 1250 AM. Rogers Communications acquired it in 1972, and moved to 1110 AM in 1977. In 1981, Rogers also launched an FM sister station, CJFI.

CKJD and CJFI were sold to Maclean-Hunter subsidiary Blue Water Broadcasting in 1987. The following year, CKJD adopted a country format with the new call sign CKTY.

When Rogers acquired Maclean-Hunter in 1994, the Blue Water stations were transferred to Blackburn Radio. Blackburn converted the station to FM in 1999, and gave the station its current call sign, CHKS-FM and changed to an active rock format under the moniker K106.3, Sarnia's Best Rock.

On July 1, 2020 at 1:06 pm, CHKS ended its active rock format with playing "Fireworks" by The Tragically Hip repeatedly from 12:00 p.m. until 1:06 p.m. The first song played on the new rock-oriented classic hits-based Cool 106.3 was "Electric Avenue" by Eddy Grant.
