= One-hit wonder =

Musical act that achieves mainstream popularity for only one piece of work

In creative industry, a one-hit wonder is an artist that achieves mainstream success with one work or product, only to never achieve it again. The term is most commonly used and associated with popular music, where the phrase either refers to any musical artist, whether it be an individual or ensemble, that achieves only one hit song, or the one hit itself. However, the trend is also seen in film, video games, fashion, theatre, books and other industries.

In recorded music, performers that only achieved commercial success with one single were first around in the pre-World War II, when sound recordings were first commercially circulated. However, the 1950s saw the beginning of record charts from magazines like Billboard, providing a consistent, quantifiable measurement of an artist's history of popularity and, in turn, their one-hit wonder status for the remainder of time.

There are several factors behind each song becoming a one-hit wonder, but academics in popular music suggest the general trend is a byproduct of the recorded music industry being extremely competitive and unpredictable. Music authors in general have debated the criteria for what is considered a one-hit wonder, with the most commonly-used being an artist that only had one top-40 entry on the Billboard Hot 100. Several artists, including some icons, meet this definition, despite having bigger success in their respective genres or by other means such as album sales, such as Lou Reed and Queen Latifah. Public perception of one-hit wonder status is also diverse, with several artists that technically had more than one hit assumed to be one-hit wonders, such as a-ha and Rick Astley.

== Qualifiers ==
The earliest one-hit single artists were released pre-World War II, the same era of the initial consumer affordability of sound recordings. Among these were "Let's Fall in Love" (1934) by Harold Arlen, "Inka Dinka Doo" (1934) by comedian Jimmy Durante, "Let's Sing Again" (1936) by child star Bobby Breen, and "It's All So New to Me" (1939) by film star Joan Crawford. The ability to consistently quantify one-hit wonder status, however, began in the 1950s, with the emergence of record charts from magazines like Billboard and Cash Box.

Due to the subjectivity of success, the particulars are not entirely agreed upon. However, the most common definition is specifically making the top-40 of the Billboard Hot 100 once. Wayne Jancik, author of The Billboard Book of One-Hit Wonder (1998), utilized a broader scope, making the top-20 of any national record chart, while others suggest only having one top-ten hit.

Some rankings of the best one-hit wonders use the top-40 Billboard definition as the criteria while not always agreeing with it. Consequence of Sound's feature, for instance, derided its limited and "xenophobic" scope in excluding songs that came close to the top-40 on the Hot 100 (peaks at 41) and success on several other Billboard charts and national record charts not in the US or from Billboard.

Some acts that meet the Billboard top-40 definition, mostly in rock music, have had greater success outside of their one hit, usually in album and ticket sales. Examples include icons, such as Lou Reed, Janis Joplin, and Jimi Hendrix, as well as Beck, the Grateful Dead and Twisted Sister. Some have numerous other Hot 100 hits outside the top 40, such as Barbara Lynn, who scored eleven charting songs but only one top-ten single with "You'll Lose a Good Thing" (1962). Some have numerous hits on charts specifically for their respective genres, such as for country and adult contemporary, thus maintaining a familiar reputation with the genre's target demographics; Queen Latifah scored several R&B, rap, and hip-hop chart hits despite only having one top-40 hit on the main Hot 100, "U.N.I.T.Y." (1993).

There are also what Ross termed the "stealth hit wonder", artists that have had longevity in popular culture and continued radio play but never charted in the top-40 while they were active. The category encompasses acts remembered for more than one song, such as Bob Marley and the Wailers and the Ramones, and acts only known for one, such as Alphaville and Modern English. Performers who never hit the top 40, but had exactly one song achieve mainstream popularity in some other fashion is a "turntable hit", or a song that was ineligible for the top-40 charts.

== Causes ==
Academics such as B. Lee Cooper, writer for the journal Popular Music and Society, and Trevor de Clercq, a professor of the recorded music industry at Middle Tennessee State University, consider the one-hit wonder phenomenon a natural byproduct of an extremely competitive industry with the unpredictable habits of consumers that have short attention spans and instant gratification. BBC Music Magazine's Steve Wright boiled it down to "a perfect convergence of timing, catchy hooks, and often just a little luck", with artists that "stumble into a single moment of pop perfection and never top it".

Supported by a study of more than 3 million songs by 69,050 artists released between 1959 and 2010, organizational psychologist Justin M. Berg supported a path dependence theory; artists who have their first hit with a "creative" (either varied or novel) back catalog were more likely to have additional hits, as the portfolio enabled more market adaptability and leveraging with past works. Conversely, having a creative portfolio decreases the chance of a first hit song than a "typical" one.

While the reasons behind an artist having only one successful song vary, there are common factors. One frequent cause is an event or series of that upends an act's career shortly after their hit's chart run, such as death (Minnie Riperton who recorded "Lovin' You", and the Big Bopper who recorded "Chantilly Lace") and band dissolution (New Radicals, artist of "You Get What You Give", and Jan and Dean, duo behind "Jennie Lee"). Band break-ups can be caused by member infighting or "fickle industry whims", explained Wright. This especially applies to child stars such as Ricky Zahnd ("(I'm Gettin') Nuttin' for Christmas") and Laurie London ("He's Got the Whole World in His Hands"). A false credit to the lead performer, whether intentional or not, can also make future hits by the actual artist much more difficult. "The All American Boy" (1958) by Bobby Bare was wrongly attributed to rockabilly musician Bill Parsons. The Vibrations' cover of "Peanut Butter" (1961) was released under the Marathons pseudonym, while "Alley Oop" (1960) was by a fictional act conceived by Gary S. Paxton, named the Hollywood Argyles.

Aspects of the industry unique to specific decades also create an abundance of one-hit wonders within them. In the 1980s, as Wright explained, several "instant, visual hits" resulted from a mix of "striking" MTV-aired music videos, quirky hooks, and synthesizers. In the 1990s, massive record labels, with the rise of CDs and radio play consolidation giving them massive power over music exposure to the public, could take massive risks with artists that "at least had a single undeniable melody or catchy lick" despite not having any perceived longevity. The app TikTok, which became an important part of launching hits in the 2020s, saw users gain a closer relationship with a song itself rather than the artist behind it, creating several hits but fewer artists with lasting relevance.

== Types ==
Many one-hit wonder songs straddle the line between a normal hit and a novelty song. Some are full-on novelties. Those of the comedic variety including Nervous Norvus' "Transfusion" (1956), Larry Verne's "Mr. Custer" (1960), and Larry Groce's "Junk Food Junkie" (1976). Novelty artists are particularly prone to being one-hit wonders due to their ephemeral nature as a "disposable art form(.)"

The popularity of some one-hit wonders are tied to a short-lived fad or public sentiment. "Disco Duck" (1976) by Rick Dees reached number-one at the height of the disco craze, while Oleta Adams's top-five cover of "Get Here" (1990) was boosted by American troops and their families using it as an anthem for their entry into the Gulf War, with hope that they would return. The Vietnam War era saw explicit political commentary towards it from multiple one-hit artists, such as Barry McGuire's "Eve of Destruction" (1965), Barry Sadler's "The Ballad of the Green Berets" (1966), and a recording of a written editorial, Gordon Sinclair's "The Americans" (along with, in a rarity for a spoken word record, a cover version by Byron MacGregor, both in 1974). Certain dances are among the trends one-hit wonders capitalize on, such as with Los del Río's "Macarena" (1995) and Lou Bega's version of "Mambo No. 5" (1999).

This especially applies to songs that are responses to or covers of other hits of the same period. Jeanne Black'a "He'll Have to Stay" (1960) was a response to Jim Reeves' "He'll Have to Go" (1959), while Bonnie Lou's "Daddy-O" (1955) covered a song by the Fontane Sisters. In particular, two common types of one-hit wonders early in the Billboard chart period were covers and songs that would become more popular when covered by a different artist. Cannibal & the Headhunters' cover of Chris Kenner's "Land of a Thousand Dances" (1965) is under both categories, as it was later covered, more famously, by Wilson Pickett.

Artists who only record music in one musical style, even the most distinguishable ones, are prone to only have one hit, as the widespread success of their one hit makes their later works of the same not as exciting to listen to. Examples include "Come On Eileen" (1982) band Dexys Midnight Runners, whose general style was a Celtic take on British soul, and ska punk group the Mighty Mighty Bosstones, of whom "The Impression That I Get" (1997) was their only hit. The Chantays' instrumental "Pipeline" (1962) had its chart run in 1963, as the surf rock genre was declining in listeners. A unique style of some one-hit wonders can be in the ethnicity, especially the foreign language of its artists, such as Domenico Modugno with "Nel Blu Dipinto Di Blu" (1958) and The Singing Nun with "Dominique" (1963), or the lyrical theme, such as the Halloween staples of "Dinner with Drac" by John Zacherle and "Monster Mash" by Bobby Pickett.

Songs primarily as themes for television series and films are a recurring kind of one-hit wonder, as they are sometimes specifically written, recorded and used to promote the media rather than the song. An early example was Joan Weber's "Let Me Go, Lover!" (1954), used for the anthology series Studio One (1948–1958). "Welcome Back" (1976), the theme for Welcome Back, Kotter (1975–1979), was the only solo hit for John Sebastian (though he had many hits as a lead vocalist for The Lovin' Spoonful), Pratt & McClain and Cyndi Grecco had their lone top-40 hits with the themes from Happy Days and Laverne & Shirley, respectively. "Take My Breath Away" (1986) from Top Gun (1986) was the sole top-40 hit for Berlin. "How Do You Talk to An Angel" (1992) was a theme for The Height (1992) performed by the series' cast under the artist name "The Heights".

== Reputation ==
Clercq summarized the one-hit wonder as "a fun yet fleeting sound track to our lives that captures the spirit of a time and place", which is emblematic of popular music in general. As one-hit wonders are huge for a brief period of time, several of them conjure the eras they were released in. "Earth Angel" (1954), the only top-40 hit for the Penguins, is soundtracked in media like Back to the Future (1954) to portray a 1950s setting. Clercq observed the one-hit wonder phenomenon creates an "exclusive club" of those that appreciate one-hit wonder artists as an "underdog" in the industry like any underground artist. On the other hand, music journalists, disc jockeys and general popular music fans have used the phrase derogatorily.

Academics of popular music, such as Clercq, suggest artists under the "one-hit wonder" label hold a negative connotation of being limited in talent and only achieving any hit at all through good luck; the impression given is that the artist was a one-trick pony. The phrase is frequently connotated to songs based around kitsch or a gimmick that are forgotten after their initial exposure. This is despite the different complex causes behind and diversity between one-hit wonders, including the fact that some one-hit artists sustain long music careers afterwards. Clercq clarifies that an artist not repeating their mainstream fame does not indicate a lack of artistic talent or even continued financial success. Cooper argues the ability to score even one hit should be respected as a "rare professional achievement".

== Public perception ==
Public perception of one-hit wonder status is diverse between acts even when their chart histories are similar. For example, "99 Luftballons" artist Nena gained a one-hit-wonder reputation due to only having one top-40 hit on the Hot 100, despite having seven top-ten hits in their home country of Germany; Styx, a group without one-hit wonder status, had 16 top-40 entries on the top 40 of the Hot 100 despite only having one hit on the top-40 of the UK singles chart, "Babe" (1979).

Many artists with multiple hits have been mis-perceived as one-hit wonders as a result of having one signature song remembered and continuously being played on classic radio stations. Examples of these include A-ha, Psy, The Romantics, Animotion, Eve 6, A Flock of Seagulls, Tommy Tutone, and Rick Astley. Billboard's Sean Ross suggests the closest example that doesn't technically meet the definition was Hanson, whose follow-up to "MMMBop", "Where's the Love", "seemed like a hit" despite not technically entering the main Hot 100.

== Lists of one-hit wonders in pop music ==
=== Australia ===
==== "20 to 1: One Hit Wonders" ====
In 2006, the Australian series 20 to 1 aired the episode "20 to 1: One Hit Wonders", a list of songs that had been the only one by that artist to have success in Australia.

#	Title	Performer	Year
1	"My Sharona"	The Knack	1979
2	"Born to Be Alive"	Patrick Hernandez	1979
3	"Video Killed the Radio Star"	The Buggles	1979
4	"Turning Japanese"	The Vapors	1980
5	"Funkytown"	Lipps Inc.	1980
6	"Dancing in the Moonlight"	King Harvest	1972
7	"Spirit in the Sky"	Norman Greenbaum	1969
8	"99 Luftballons"	Nena	1983
9	"Don't Worry, Be Happy"	Bobby McFerrin	1988
10	"Pass the Dutchie"	Musical Youth	1982
11	"Rockin' Robin"	Bobby Day	1958
12	"Slice of Heaven"	Dave Dobbyn and Herbs	1986
13	"Counting the Beat"	The Swingers	1981
14	"Tubthumping"	Chumbawamba	1997
15	"I'll Be Gone"	Spectrum	1971
16	"Mickey"	Toni Basil	1982
17	"Achy Breaky Heart"	Billy Ray Cyrus	1992
18	"Venus"	Shocking Blue	1969
19	"Mambo No. 5 (A Little Bit of...)"	Lou Bega	1999
20	"Tainted Love"	Soft Cell	1981

=== New Zealand ===
==== C4's UChoose40: One Hit Wonders ====
In September 2006, New Zealand's terrestrial music channel, C4, aired an episode dedicated to "One Hit Wonders" on the weekly theme-based chart show, UChoose40, where the chart was ranked entirely by viewer's votes from the website.

The top ten songs were ranked as follows:

#	Title	Performer	Year
1	"Teenage Dirtbag"	Wheatus	2000
2	"How Bizarre"	OMC	1996
3	"Because I Got High"	Afroman	2001
4	"Ice Ice Baby"	Vanilla Ice	1990
5	"Eye of the Tiger"	Survivor	1982
6	"Tubthumping"	Chumbawamba	1997
7	"My Sharona"	The Knack	1979
8	"Video Killed the Radio Star"	The Buggles	1979
9	"Who Let the Dogs Out"	Baha Men	2000
10	"I Touch Myself"	Divinyls	1991

=== United Kingdom ===
The Guinness Book of British Hit Singles contains a list of 'one hit wonders' from 1979 to 2001 which comprises acts with their only Top 75 charting record being a number one hit.

==== One-Hit Wonders from the 1980s ====
Classic Pop magazine's list only includes acts who made the UK's Top 40 (as compiled by Gallup) once only in their careers and does not include acts which feature members from other successful bands from the 1980s. The top ten is as follows:

1. "The First Picture of You" – The Lotus Eaters
2. "Twilight Café" – Susan Fassbender
3. "Big in Japan" – Alphaville
4. "Broken Land" – The Adventures
5. "Waiting for a Train" – Flash and the Pan
6. "Waiting for a Star to Fall" – Boy Meets Girl
7. "99 Red Balloons" – Nena
8. "Let My People Go-Go" – The Rainmakers
9. "The Captain of Her Heart" – Double
10. "Kissing with Confidence" – Will Powers

==== One-Hit Wonders from the 1990s ====
In 2020, Absolute Radio 90s compiled a list of 'the 20 greatest one-hit wonders of the 1990s' as part of their 10th birthday celebrations; the list was as follows (listed in alphabetical order by artist):

- "Spaceman" – Babylon Zoo (1996)
- "Wake Up Boo!" – The Boo Radleys (1995)
- "Drinking in L.A." – Bran Van 3000 (1997)
- "Bitch" – Meredith Brooks (1997)
- "Would I Lie to You?" – Charles & Eddie (1992)
- "Brimful of Asha" (Norman Cook Remix) – Cornershop (1997)
- "Mmm Mmm Mmm Mmm" – Crash Test Dummies (1993)
- "What's Up?" – 4 Non Blondes (1993)
- "There She Goes" – The La's (1990)
- "Steal My Sunshine" – Len (1999)
- "Everybody's Free (To Wear Sunscreen)" – Baz Luhrmann (1999)
- "The Impression That I Get" – The Mighty Mighty Bosstones (1997)
- "Flat Beat" – Mr. Oizo (1999)
- "You Get What You Give" – New Radicals (1998)
- "You're Not Alone" – Olive (1997)
- "How Bizarre" – OMC (1995)
- "In the Meantime" – Spacehog (1996)
- "Two Princes" – Spin Doctors (1993)
- "Inside" – Stiltskin (1994)
- "Your Woman" – White Town (1997)

In addition to these one-hit wonders, the NME also recognised the following hits in their one-hit wonders feature from 2014:

- "Sleeping Satellite" – Tasmin Archer (1992)
- "No Rain" – Blind Melon (1993)
- "Tubthumping" – Chumbawamba (1997)
- "Save Tonight" – Eagle-Eye Cherry (1997)
- "Groove Is in the Heart" – Deee-Lite (1990)
- "Breakfast at Tiffany's" – Deep Blue Something (1995)
- "I Touch Myself" – Divinyls (1990)
- "To Earth with Love" – Gay Dad (1999)
- "Three Little Pigs" – Green Jellÿ (1992)
- "Glorious" – Andreas Johnson (1999)
- "Here Comes the Hotstepper" – Ini Kamoze (1994)
- "Jump" – Kris Kross (1992)
- "Stay" – Lisa Loeb (1994)
- "Can You Dig It?" – The Mock Turtles (1991)
- "One of Us" – Joan Osborne (1995)
- "I'll Be There for You" – The Rembrandts (1995)
- "Everybody's Free (To Feel Good)" – Rozalla (1991)
- "Scatman (Ski-Ba-Bop-Ba-Dop-Bop)" – Scatman John (1994)
- "Closing Time" – Semisonic (1998)
- "Baby Got Back" – Sir Mix-a-Lot (1992)
- "Runaway Train" – Soul Asylum (1993)
- "Connected" – Stereo MC's (1992)
- "Cotton Eye Joe" – Rednex (1994)
- "One Headlight" – The Wallflowers (1997)

==== One-Hit Wonders from the 2000s ====
From the BBC in March 2017 (based on a combination of chart position and sales):

- "Because I Got High" – Afroman (2001)
- "An Honest Mistake" – The Bravery (2005)
- "Do You Really Like It?" – DJ Pied Piper and the Masters of Ceremonies (2001)
- "Mercy" – Duffy (2008)
- "Crazy" – Gnarls Barkley (2006)
- "Move Your Feet" – Junior Senior (2002)
- "The Ketchup Song (Aserejé)" – Las Ketchup (2002)
- "Groovejet (If This Ain't Love)" – Spiller (featuring Sophie Ellis-Bextor) (2000)

From the BBC Radio 2 show One Hit Wonders with OJ Borg which started on 2 November 2020...(in alphabetical order):

- Bodyrockers – "I Like the Way" (2005)
- Caesars – "Jerk It Out" (2002)
- Kevin Lyttle (feat. Spraga Benz) – "Turn Me On" (2003)
- Nizlopi – "The JCB Song" (2005)
- Planet Funk – "Chase the Sun" (2001)
- Sweet Female Attitude – "Flowers" (2000)
- The Temper Trap – "Sweet Disposition" (2008)

==== One-Hit Wonders from the 2010s ====
The Official Charts Company's list of the biggest one-hit wonder releases of the 2010s, is based on sales and streams. Like the Classic Pop list it uses the UK singles Top 40 chart as the cut-off point. The top ten is as follows:

1. Passenger – "Let Her Go" (2012)
2. Yolanda Be Cool featuring DCUP – "We No Speak Americano" (2010)
3. Lukas Graham – "7 Years" (2015)
4. Mr. Probz – "Waves" (2013)
5. Gotye featuring Kimbra – "Somebody That I Used to Know" (2011)
6. Walk the Moon – "Shut Up and Dance" (2014)
7. Calum Scott – "Dancing on My Own" (2016)
8. Vance Joy – "Riptide" (2013)
9. Portugal. The Man – "Feel It Still" (2017)
10. The Lumineers – "Ho Hey" (2012)
11. Kungs vs. Cookin' on 3 Burners – "This Girl" (2016)

== See also ==
- 15 minutes of fame
- List of English signature songs
- Summer hit
- "One-Hit Wonder" by Blair Packham, a 2004 song about the classic one-hit wonder "Monster Mash" by Bobby Pickett.
- That Thing You Do! – a 1996 American comedy film about the rise and fall of a fictional 1960s one-hit wonder pop band.
- List of one-hit wonders on the UK Albums Chart – artists who have had a number one hit album and charted one Top 40 hit album in the OCC chart
- List of one-hit wonders on the UK Singles Downloads Chart – including separate lists for featured artists and ensemble groups
- List of one-hit wonders on the UK singles chart – artists who have had a number one hit single and no other charting Top 75 hit singles in the OCC chart
