= Dou3le =

Studio album by Double
- Released: 9 November 1987
- Recorded: February–June 1987
- Studio: Powerplay (Maur, Switzerland); Britannia Row (London); A&M (Los Angeles)
- Genre: Sophisti-pop
- Length: 45:33
- Label: Metronome
- Producer: Felix Haug; Double

Double chronology
Blue (1985)	Dou3le (1987)

Dou3le is the second and final studio album by Swiss musical duo Double, released in 1987 by Metronome. Despite including the acclaimed single "Devils Ball", it failed to emulate the success of its predecessor Blue.

== Background and release ==
Having finished extensive promotion for their previous album, Blue, and the commercially successful single "The Captain of Her Heart", Double soon returned to the studio to record their next album Dou3le. It was recorded between February and June 1987 at Powerplay Studios in Maur, Switzerland, at Britannia Row Studios in London and at A&M Studios in Los Angeles. As soon as recording sessions started, the duo faced musical differences over the direction of Double's sound. Kurt Maloo wanted to continue producing pop songs similar to their debut album, whereas Felix Haug wanted to try more experimental ideas. Recalling the album in a 2011 interview with i:Vibes, Maloo said: "We thought of it as our third [full-length] album because it took so long to make it. Dou3le is not my favourite album. The album isn't homogeneous. Everybody was doing his own thing and we were about to split up over the recording process." He added in a 2013 interview with the Kickin' It Old School blog: "When we met for the production of our second album we already had different concepts regarding Double's future. I wanted to stick to the format of the pop song while Felix wanted to create more epic and cinematographic soundscapes."

Released in 1987, Dou3le only charted in Switzerland, peaking at number nine. The lead single, "Devils Ball", was released in September 1987 in the United States, and October elsewhere. It reached number 71 on the UK Singles Chart. The follow-up, "Gliding", was released as a promotional single in the United States in December, and as an official single across Europe in June 1988. Although the band began working on a third album, musical differences resulted in the band's breakup in 1989. In 2000, Dou3le was reissued on CD in Switzerland through Maloo's own Doublecity label, including two bonus tracks.

== Critical reception ==
Upon release, Keyboard described the album as consisting of "moody, mysterious pop songs centered around Felix Haug's piano and synthesizers." They added: "The ersatz Arabian sound of 'Lakes In The Desert' owes more to the Beatles than to any genuine third-world sensibility, but Double has a style all their own." Billboard commented: "[Double] specializes in a kind of muted Europop with new agey bias, and overall effect of its latest is soothing in the extreme. However, hooks are in short supply, leaving long-term chart prospects dim at best."

== Track listing ==
All tracks are written by Felix Haug and Kurt Maloo, except "Wrong Time" by Maloo and "Megarythmdance" by Haug

No.	Title	Length
1.	"Fire in Disguise"	5:29
2.	"Gliding"	5:05
3.	"Lakes in the Desert"	4:43
4.	"Circles"	5:18
5.	"Prove Your Love"	3:52
6.	"(You Don't Let Me Get) Close Enough"	4:47
7.	"Silent Mountain"	4:42
8.	"Devils Ball"	4:29
9.	"Wrong Time"	1:52
10.	"Megarhythmdance"	5:16
Total length:		45:33

2000 Doublecity CD reissue bonus tracks
No.	Title	Length
10.	"Gliding" (Single Version)	3:39
11.	"Devils Ball" (Piano Version)	4:49
Total length:		54:01

== Personnel ==
Credits adapted from the liner notes of Dou3le.

=== Double ===
- Kurt Maloo – arrangements, vocals, guitars
- Felix Haug – arrangements, keyboards, synths, drums, programming

=== Additional musicians ===
- Herb Alpert – trumpet (track 8)
- Michael Urbaniak – electric violin (track 8)
- Peter Glenister – guitars (tracks 1, 2, 6, 7)
- Marc Portmann – guitar solo (track 7)
- Christian Ostermeier – saxes, flute (tracks 1, 5)
- Jürg Grau – trumpet (track 4)
- John Spencer Sugden, Nigel Woodhouse – mandolins (track 8)
- Beverly Brown, Maxine Brown, Gloria Brown – backing vocals

=== Technical ===
- Felix Haug – production
- Double – production, post-production, mixing
- Mike Pela – post-production, mixing
- John Acock, Arabella Rodriguez, Martin Pearson, Mark McKenna – engineering

=== Artwork ===
- Jost Wildbolz – photography
- Hans Inauen – cover design

== Charts ==
Chart performance for Dou3le
Chart (1987)	Peak position
Swiss Albums (Schweizer Hitparade)	9
