= Devils Ball =

Single by Double

from the album Dou3le
- B-side: "Devils Ball (Edited Piano Version)"
- Released: October 1987
- Genre: Jazz rock, sophisti-pop
- Length: 3:48 (7" version); 4:29 (album version)
- Label: Polydor Records; A&M Records (America)
- Songwriters: Kurt Maloo, Felix Haug
- Producers: Felix Haug, Double

Double singles chronology
| "Tomorrow" (1986) | "Devils Ball" (1987) | "Gliding" (1987) |

"Devils Ball" is a song by the Swiss duo Double, released in 1987 as the lead single from their second studio album Dou3le. It was written and produced by Kurt Maloo and Felix Haug. The song featured a guest appearance from Herb Alpert, who played trumpet on the track, and an electric violin solo by Michał Urbaniak.

== Background ==
Following the duo's breakthrough success with their 1985 album Blue, and the hit single "The Captain of Her Heart", Double began working on a follow-up album in early 1987, which was released later that year as Dou3le. The leading single, "Devils Ball", was released in October and reached No. 71 in the UK, lasting within the Top 100 for four weeks. It also reached No. 30 in Belgium. The Dou3le album failed to emulate the success of its predecessor, while a second single, "Gliding", was not a success either.

Speaking to i:Vibes in 2011, Maloo expressed his thoughts on the single: "Our single "Devils Ball" was a big accident. It wasn't a hit, because the guy that played the electric violin couldn't play the theme on the acoustic violin. I wanted an acoustic violin, but in the end we went with the electric violin and a free interpretation of the lead theme. I didn't want this and I knew it wasn't good for the song, so I asked Herb Alpert who owned A&M Records to play the main melody on the trumpet, but in the end the violin survived along with the trumpet. The label wasn't happy, because we had [already] had a hit, but radio stations didn't play it, because it was too experimental sounding." Speaking of Alpert, Maloo added: "10 years later I saw him at his concert again in Hamburg. He insisted that "Devils Ball" should have been a big hit and that it's a shame it wasn't. He obviously hates to lose."

In a 2013 interview with the Kickin' it Old School blog, Maloo explained his reaction to the duo's inability to gain further hit singles after "The Captain of Her Heart": "It was more surprising rather than frustrating at the time. We had minor hits with "Woman Of The World" and "Devils Ball", but they couldn't compete with "The Captain's" popularity at all. We were proud of other songs we had created, but it's like when the sun is shining you don't see the beautiful stars, although they're there all the time."

In 2006, Maloo released the album Loopy Avenue, which featured a new recording of "Devils Ball". The album explored the impact Double had had on him following the unexpected death of Haug in 2004, which prompted Maloo to revisit the past twenty years. The result was four re-recordings of previous Double tracks from the 1980s as well as eight new and previously unheard tracks by Kurt Maloo and Double. Herb Alpert reprised his role on trumpet for the new recording of "Devils Ball".

== Release ==
"Devils Ball" was released on 7" vinyl, 12" vinyl and CD single through Polydor Records, except in America, where it was issued by A&M Records. Outside of the US and Canada, it was released in the UK, Spain, Germany, the Netherlands, and also Australia. The 7" vinyl version of the single featured an edited version of the song, cut by over half a minute in comparison with the album version. The B-side was an edited "Piano Version" of the same track.

The 12" vinyl edition issued across Europe featured the full "Unedited Version" of "Devils Ball" – the same as the album version – while an "Unedited Version" of the "Piano Version" was included. A third track for the 12" vinyl was taken from the Doub3le album, "Megarhythmdance". In America, A&M Records released an altered version of the 12" vinyl, featuring four different versions of "Devils Ball". In order these were the full album version, the edited "Piano Version", the edited version (7" version) and the full "Piano Version". A Canadian 12" vinyl was released in promotional form only, and featured the full album version of the track on both sides. The CD version of the single featured four tracks – the "Unedited Version" of "Devils Ball", the band's 1985 hit "The Captain of Her Heart, the "Unedited Piano Version" of "Devils Ball", and "Megarhythmdance".

== Promotion ==
An award-winning music video was filmed to promote the single, which featured Maloo and Haug alongside Alpert on trumpet, and performers from the Swiss mime group "Mummenschanz". The video won the Silver Palm Award in Cannes during 1988.

Speaking to Kickin' it Old School in 2013, Maloo revealed the idea behind the video: "I wanted the "Devils Ball" video to be an homage to Jean Cocteau's Le Sang d'un Poete (The Blood of a Poet, a surreal movie from 1930. All the "effects" in the video had to be built since there was no post-production or animation at the time. The directors did a great job. We asked the mime group Mummenschanz to participate in the video and they surprised us with the idea of creating masks of clay live in the very moment the video was shot."

During 1987, the band also appeared on the German TV show Peters Popshow, where they performed the song, along with "Gliding".

== Critical reception ==
Upon release, Cash Box listed the single as one of their "feature picks" during October 1987. They commented: "This jazzy pop number should gain instant acceptance at A/C radio, with Top 40 crossover."

== Track listing ==
7" Single

1. "Devils Ball (Edited Version)" – 3:48
2. "Devils Ball (Edited Piano Version)" – 3:47

12" Single

1. "Devils Ball (Unedited Version)" – 4:29
2. "Devils Ball (Unedited Piano Version)" – 4:51
3. "Megarhythmdance" – 5:13

12" Single (US only)

1. "Devils Ball" – 4:29
2. "Devils Ball (Edited Piano Version)" – 3:47
3. "Devils Ball (Edited Version)" – 3:47
4. "Devils Ball (Piano Version)" – 4:51

12" Single (Canadian promo)

1. "Devils Ball (Album Version)" – 4:29
2. "Devils Ball (Album Version)" – 4:29

CD single

1. "Devils Ball (Unedited Version)" – 4:29
2. "The Captain of Her Heart" – 4:35
3. "Devils Ball (Unedited Piano Version)" – 4:49
4. "Megarhythmdance" – 5:13

== Charts ==
=== Weekly charts ===
| Chart (1987) | Peak position |
|---|---|
| Belgian Singles Chart (Vl) | 30 |
| Italy Airplay (Music & Media) | 11 |
| UK Singles Chart | 71 |

== Personnel ==
Double

- Kurt Maloo – vocals, guitar, arrangement, producer (as Felix Haug & Double for Naningo Ltd.)
- Felix Haug – keyboards, synthesizer, drums, programming, producer (as Felix Haug & Double for Naningo Ltd.), arrangement

Additional personnel

- Herb Alpert – trumpet
- Michał Urbaniak – electric violin
- The Browns - Beverly Brown, Gloria Brown, Maxine Brown – backing vocals
