= Blue (Double album) =

Studio album by Double
- Released: 15 October 1985
- Recorded: March–June 1985
- Studios: Can (Cologne, Germany); Picar (Stein am Rhein, Switzerland)
- Genre: Sophisti-pop
- Length: 35:38
- Label: Metronome
- Producer: Double

Double chronology
Naningo (1983)	Blue (1985)	Dou3le (1987)

Professional ratings
Review scores
Source	Rating
AllMusic	3/5 stars
Sounds	2/5 stars

Blue is the debut studio album by Swiss musical duo Double, released on 15 October 1985 by Metronome. In addition to updated versions of two of the band's earlier singles ("Woman of the World" and "Rangoon Moon"), the album includes the ballad "The Captain of Her Heart", which was an immediate success throughout Europe (and eventually, the United States) upon its 1986 single release. Follow-up singles "Your Prayer Takes Me Off" and "Tomorrow" were less successful.

== Track listing ==
All tracks are written by Kurt Maloo and Felix Haug.

1. "Woman of the World" – 3:52
2. "I Know a Place" – 3:40
3. "The Captain of Her Heart" – 4:35
4. "Your Prayer Takes Me Off" – 6:20
5. "Rangoon Moon" – 4:01
6. "Urban Nomads" – 4:55
7. "Love Is a Plane" – 3:40
8. "Tomorrow" – 4:35

== Personnel ==
Credits adapted from the liner notes of Blue.

Double

- Kurt Maloo
- Felix Haug

Additional musicians

- Christian Ostermeier – saxophone, flute
- Bob Morgan – trombone solo on "Woman of the World"
- Thomas Jordi – fretless bass on "Tomorrow"
- Liz McComb – additional vocals on "I Know a Place" and "Your Prayer Takes Me Off"

Production

- Double – producers
- Phil Carmen – engineer
- René Tinner – engineer
- Hans Inauen – cover design
- Barbara Davatz – photography (indoors)
- Marco Schaaf – photography (outdoors)

== Charts ==
=== Weekly charts ===
Weekly chart performance for Blue
Chart (1985–1986)	Peak position
Australian (Kent Music Report)	71
Austrian Albums (Ö3 Austria)	15
Canada Top Albums/CDs (RPM)	30
European Albums (Eurotipsheet)	40
German Albums (Offizielle Top 100)	14
Italian Albums (Musica e dischi)	5
Swiss Albums (Schweizer Hitparade)	2
UK Albums (Official Charts)	69
US Billboard 200	30

=== Year-end charts ===
Year-end chart performance for Blue
Chart (1985)	Position
Swiss Albums (Schweizer Hitparade)	30
