= CKLW =

Radio station in Windsor, Ontario, Canada

- Windsor, Ontario; Canada
- Broadcast area: Southwestern Ontario; Detroit–Windsor
- Frequency: 800 kHz (AM)
- Branding: AM 800 CKLW

Programming
- Format: News/talk
- Affiliations: CHWI-DT; The Canadian Press; Premiere Networks; Windsor Spitfires

Ownership
- Owner: Bell Media; (Bell Media Radio)
- Sister stations: CHWI-DT, CIDR-FM, CIMX-FM

History
- First air date: June 2, 1932; 94 years ago
- Former call signs: CKWO (CP, 1932); CKOK (1932–1933)
- Former frequencies: 540 kHz (1932–1933); 840 kHz (1933–1934); 1030 kHz (1934–1941)
- Call sign meaning: London-Windsor (broadcast area)

Technical information
- Class: B
- Power: 50,000 watts
- Transmitter coordinates: 42.0569°N 83.0028°W

Links
- Webcast: Listen Live
- Website: am800cklw.com

CKLW (800 AM) is a commercial radio station in Windsor, Ontario, serving Southwestern Ontario and Metro Detroit. CKLW is owned by Bell Media and has a news/talk radio format. It features local hosts in morning and afternoon drive times, with syndicated Canadian hosts in middays and evenings, plus Coast to Coast AM with George Noory overnight. Evening newscasts are simulcast from CHWI-DT Channel 16 CTV Windsor.

CKLW is a 50,000-watt Class B station, using a five-tower array directional antenna with differing patterns day and night. Despite its high power, it must protect Class A clear-channel station XEROK in Ciudad Juárez, Mexico, and other Canadian and U.S. stations on 800 AM. The transmitter is off County Road 20 West in southern Essex County, between Amherstburg and Harrow, only a few kilometres from the Lake Erie shoreline.

== History ==
=== Overview ===
CKLW was an internationally known Top 40 station in the 1960s and 1970s. During this era, CKLW used a tight Top 40 format known as Boss Radio, devised by radio programmer Bill Drake. However, CKLW never actually used the handle "boss" on the air, just the style. Rather than a Boss 30, CKLW's weekly music survey was known as a Big 30. And instead of calling itself Boss Radio, CKLW called itself The Big 8.

During this period it was the top-rated radio station not only in Windsor, but across the river in Detroit, and even in cities as far away as Toledo and Cleveland.

=== Before the "Big 8": Gentile and Binge ===
CKLW first came on the air on June 2, 1932, as CKOK on 540 kilocycles, (which until 2013 was the long-time home of today's CBEF) with 5,000 watts of power. Originally, the original proposed callsign was CKWO, but it changed to CKOK due to confusion. The station was built by George Storer and was sold to a group of Windsor-area businessmen led by Malcolm Campbell, operating as "Essex Broadcasters, Ltd." CKOK became CKLW (and moved to 840 kHz) in 1933, when Essex Broadcasters, Ltd. merged with the London Free Press and its station CJGC (now CFPL), and became "Western Ontario Broadcasting", which was co-owned by Essex Broadcasters, and the London Free Press. The "LW" in the callsign is said to have stood for "London, Windsor", considered the two chief cities in the station's listening area. When the station's power increased to 50,000 watts, its listening area increased accordingly. In 1934, when London Free Press's station CJGC pulled out of the agreement, the station became wholly owned by Western Ontario Broadcasters. CJGC later evolved into today's CFPL, while CKLW moved from 840 to 1030 kHz in 1934, before settling on its present frequency of 800 kHz in 1941, thanks to a shuffle of frequency allocations.

CKLW for most of its history had a distinctly American accent to its programming, and for a number of years served as the Detroit affiliate of the Mutual Broadcasting System, an affiliation that began with its switch from CBS to Mutual September 29, 1935, and which would last from then until its purchase by RKO General in 1963. When Mutual was restructured as a cooperative in 1940, CKLW was one of the major shareholders in the network. Alongside its affiliation with Mutual, it also gained a dual affiliation with the CBC in 1935, replacing its CBS Radio Network affiliation with that of Mutual/CBC. In 1948, it became an affiliate of the CBC's Dominion Network as well as the main network which became known as the Trans-Canada Network. The Trans-Canada Network affiliation would last until 1950, when CBE 1550 launched and the Dominion Network affiliation remained until 1962 when the network dissolved. The Mutual System's owner, General Tire and Rubber Company, purchased a controlling interest in CKLW and its owner at the time, Western Ontario Broadcasting in 1956, along with RKO General (which had purchased a minority interest in 1954 and had controlled Mutual since 1952). RKO would later increase its stake to 100% in 1963.

In the late 1930s and early 1940s, CKLW was home to Happy Joe's Early Morning Frolic with Joe Gentile and Toby David, which was one of the first popular comedy-oriented radio morning shows in Detroit. The show continued strong after David left CKLW for Washington, D.C., in 1940, and was replaced by Ralph Binge. The duo kept listeners entertained with an endless stream of comedic sketches and situations. The show's sponsors got in on the fun as well, as Gentile and Binge's trademark was their ability to turn a standard 60-second commercial announcement into a comedy sketch that could run for three minutes or longer. A typical three-and-a-half-hour Gentile and Binge show might feature such comedic commercials for as many as fifty legitimate products, and some imaginary ones as well. Sometimes listeners didn't get the joke. For example, according to popular legend, after promoting a miracle weight-loss aid called "Dr. Quack's Slim Jim Reducing Pills" with the story of an obese woman who got stuck in a telephone booth, Gentile and Binge received over $3,000 from listeners requesting a $1 trial of the pills as advertised, and the station had to hire a clerk to return the money.

Gentile and Binge were a fixture on CKLW until moving to WJBK radio (now WLQV) in 1948, attracting audience ratings as high as 80% at their peak. The duo disbanded their partnership in 1956, and Gentile returned to CKLW. Toby David also eventually returned to AM 800 to host the morning show in the late 1950s and early 1960s. Both Binge and David were also stars of early Detroit television kiddie shows: Binge was "Pirate Pete" on WJBK-TV in the mid-1950s, and David became CKLW-TV's (now CBET-DT) "Captain Jolly" later in the decade (a role which, ironically, Binge had originally been tagged to play).

As television's popularity boomed, CKLW, like many other stations, coped with the changes by replacing the dying network radio fare with locally based disc-jockey shows. Throughout most of the 1950s and into the mid-1960s, CKLW was basically a "variety" radio station which filled in the cracks between full-service features with pop music played by announcers like Bud Davies, Ron Knowles (who had a rock-and-roll show on AM 800 as early as 1957), and Joe Van. For a few years in the early 1960s, CKLW also featured a country music program in the evenings called Sounds Like Nashville. This ended in 1963 when WEXL 1340 became Detroit's first 24-hour country station.

=== “The Big 8” and the glory years ===
After RKO General took over the station and its FM sister in 1963, CKLW began to shed the variety-format approach and, as "Radio Eight-Oh", began focusing more aggressively on playing contemporary hits and issuing a record survey. Davies, Knowles, Dave Shafer, Tom Clay, Tom Shannon, Larry Morrow (as "Duke Windsor"), Terry Knight, and Don Zee were among the "Radio Eight-Oh" personalities during this time. The station did well thanks to its huge signal, and beat the local competition in Cleveland, Ohio, though in the local Detroit ratings CKLW still lagged well behind competing hit outlet WKNR.

However, on April 4, 1967, CKLW got a drastic makeover with Bill Drake's "Boss Radio" format, programmed locally by Paul Drew. Initially known as "Radio 8" with PAMS jingles, within a few months the station's final transformation into "The Big 8," with new jingles sung by the Johnny Mann Singers, was complete, and the station was on a rapid ratings upswing. In July 1967, CKLW claimed the number one spot in the Detroit ratings for the first time, and WKNR was left in the dust, switching to an easy listening format as WNIC less than five years later.

In addition to Dave Shafer and Tom Shannon, the lone holdouts from the "Radio Eight Oh" era, "Big 8" personalities during the late 1960s and through the mid-1970s included Gary "Morning Mouth" Burbank, "Big" Jim Edwards, "Brother" Bill Gable, Pat Holiday, Steve Hunter, "Super" Max Kinkel, Walt "Baby" Love, Charlie O'Brien, Scott Regen, Ted "The Bear" Richards, Mike Rivers, Duke Roberts, Charlie Van Dyke, Johnny Williams, and newsmen Randall Carlisle, Grant Hudson, Byron MacGregor (who had a three-and-a-half million-selling #1 hit single with his recording of Gordon Sinclair's commentary "The Americans" in 1973), and Dick Smyth.

The station had strong talent behind the scenes as well, most notably longtime music director Rosalie Trombley, who ascended to that position in 1968 after having worked as the station's music librarian for five years and became famous for her apparent hit record-spotting abilities. Trombley consciously made an effort to choose the right R&B and soul songs (especially Motown songs) to create a station that would appeal equally to black and white listeners. As a result, CKLW was sometimes referred to as "the blackest white station in America", and many believe the integrated music mix helped bring Detroiters closer together in racial harmony, especially after the riots of July 1967. The "Rosalie Trombley Award" honours women who have made their mark in broadcasting. Another female employee of CKLW who helped break down gender barriers was reporter Jo-Jo Shutty-MacGregor (the wife of Byron MacGregor), the first female helicopter traffic/news reporter in North America.

The Windsor-based station maintained a sales office in the Detroit suburb of Southfield, Michigan, where it picked up numerous sponsors for U.S. consumer products, some of which had to use the disclaimer and live announcer end-tag "Not available in Ontario". Possibly the best known of sponsors was Merollis Chevrolet, known for its comedic 30-second spots and the campy Al Jolson-styled jingle "Gene Merollis what a great great guy!"

Another feature of the "Big 8" was its "20/20 News", so-called because it was delivered at 20 minutes after the hour and 20 minutes before the hour - scheduling that allowed CKLW to be playing music while other stations were airing newscasts at the top of the hour or on the quarter-hour. The CKLW newscasters — including Byron MacGregor, Jon Belmont (later ABC), Bob Losure (CNN), Dick Smyth (who would later become the first newscast when Toronto's CFTR went all-news in 1993), Grant Hudson, Joe Donovan (sports), Mark Dailey (CityNews), Randall Carlisle, Keith Radford, and Lee Marshall — delivered imagery-laden news stories in a rapid-fire, excited manner, not sparing any of the gory details when it came to describing murders or rapes. This was an attempt to make the news sound as exciting and gripping as the music. The "blood and guts" style began with Byron MacGregor's promotion to news director (replacing Smyth) in 1969. Another memorable feature of the 20/20 newscasts was the incessant clacking of the teletype in the background, which gave the newscasts a unique sound.

CKLW's newscasts were acknowledged for more than just their "flash," however; the station won an Edward R. Murrow Award for its coverage of the 1967 riots, helmed by Smyth. This was the first time that this particular award had ever been given to a Canadian broadcaster.

=== The decline and death of the Big 8 ===
Some listeners believe that CKLW started to decline in popularity after Canadian content regulations went into effect in 1971. Although having to play 30% "CanCon" songs that generated little in the way of sales put the station at a competitive disadvantage compared to its U.S.-based competition, CKLW still managed to help break a number of Canadian songs and artists in the United States. These included Anne Murray, The Poppy Family, Gordon Lightfoot, Joni Mitchell, The Guess Who, April Wine, the Five Man Electrical Band, and Bachman Turner Overdrive. Just as, if not more, responsible for the decline in CKLW's ratings as the 1970s wore on was the rise of FM radio as an outlet for contemporary music, as the station gained a direct FM Top 40 competitor, WDRQ, in 1972, and its listening audience was also fragmented between album-oriented rock outlets such as WWWW, WRIF and WABX and adult contemporary stations like WNIC and WMJC. The Canadian government's initial unwillingness to license FM frequencies with pop or rock formats stranded Canadian stations on AM while an entire demographic of listeners began the exodus to US-based FM outlets anywhere the signals were in range. For many younger listeners by 1978, CKLW was the station they listened to only if they had an AM-only radio in their cars.

As a result, like many other powerhouse AM Top 40 stations, CKLW evolved during the late 1970s into an Adult Top 40 direction. The station's music softened to the point where, by 1982, it gave no airtime to harder-rocking songs like Joan Jett's "I Love Rock 'n' Roll", and jingles were initially phased out, with new jingles and a new slogan ("The Great Entertainer") being introduced in 1979.

Dick Purtan joined the station for mornings in 1978, coming over from WXYZ. Largely due to Purtan's popularity, CKLW remained a moderately popular station into the early 1980s, but after Purtan departed at the start of 1983 for FM competitor WCZY, the station quickly tumbled to the bottom of Detroit's Arbitron ratings (its last appearance in the Top 10 was in 1981). In an attempt to go after longtime "full service" powerhouse WJR, CKLW converted to AM stereo in 1982 and even got the rights to broadcast University of Michigan football and NASL soccer, but in this, it was also unsuccessful.

In 1984, Baton Broadcasting sold CKLW-AM-FM to Russwood Broadcasting Ltd. Also in 1984, CKLW made an attempt to transfer its CHR format to its FM sister station, big band and jazz standards-formatted CKJY-FM. These hopes were dashed when the Canadian Radio-television and Telecommunications Commission (CRTC) refused to approve the format change on anything more than an "experimental" basis, reasoning that FM was for "fine" music and that Top 40 music belonged on AM.

The final death knell for the "Big 8" came in October 1984, when the station fired 79 staffers (including most of the remaining announcers and Rosalie Trombley), closed its American sales office in the Detroit suburb of Southfield, Michigan, and announced that it would soon change format to Al Ham's "Music of Your Life" format of Jazz standards and big-band music and go completely automated. The "Big 8" was finally laid to rest on December 8, 1984, and the station soon dropped stereo since most of the big-band and jazz standards music in its new format was in mono anyway. CKLW's FM sister adopted a beautiful music format with the callsign CKEZ. Briefly, it attempted to resurrect the glory years of the "Big 8" by playing oldies and the jingles from the AM legend's peak years in the late 1960s. At this time, both stations were also sold to CUC Broadcasting, which would sell CKLW and CKEZ to CHUM Limited in 1993. For a brief time under CUC Broadcasting ownership, it was a member of the NBC Radio network beginning in 1991 (which was by then a shell of its former self), and ending with the station's sale to CHUM Limited in 1993.

CKLW was known as K-800 during its "Music of Your Life" days, and also became the radio home for the Detroit Pistons. Ratings improved dramatically, as the station shot back into the Top 10, although the demographics of the station's audience were now substantially older. Longtime CKLW jock and Detroit radio veteran Dave Shafer was the "K-800" program director during this time.

=== Modern history ===
CHUM Limited, which already owned CKWW and CIMX-FM in the Windsor/Detroit market, purchased CKLW-AM-FM in February 1993, and subsequently swapped the formats of CKWW and CKLW on March 1, moving the nostalgic music down to 580 on the AM dial and planting CKWW's news-talk format on 800, and thus ending the music on AM 800 for good.

Today, CKLW combines local talk radio with U.S.-based syndication programs and those produced by CHUM. The station now goes by the name AM 800, The Information Station (or as "AM 800 CKLW"). The station boasts a fully staffed local newsroom and also airs hourly newscasts from The Canadian Press radio network (formerly known as Broadcast News), primarily at night. CKLW is picked up clearly as far off as Toledo and Cleveland (where it was consistently a highly rated station during its Top 40 days), Lansing, Michigan, and even the outskirts of Cincinnati, Ohio, with reports of night-time reception as far off as Toronto/Oshawa, Ontario; Hartford, Connecticut; Pennsylvania; New York City; Little Rock; Des Moines, Iowa; and San Antonio, Texas. At one point, it was stated that CKLW could be heard in at least 23 states and 4 Canadian provinces.

For the station to be heard as far west as Arkansas, Iowa and Texas is impressive, given the station is not a "clear channel" Class A station, and has an extreme northward/eastward nighttime directional signal in order to protect stations on 800 kHz in Ciudad Juárez (clear channel XEROK-AM across the river from El Paso, Texas). A station in Bonaire in the Netherlands Antilles (PJB3, Trans World Radio), provided severe interference to CKLW during its Big 8 years and beyond, operating with 525,000 watts of power. CKLW was and is under no obligation to protect Bonaire, as PJB signed on long after North American allocations were settled and the Netherlands Antilles did not honour international agreements.

During CKLW's Top 40 heyday, because of its nighttime directional pattern, the station was frequently heard in Scandinavia, but was often rendered unlistenable just a few hundred miles to the west and south of Detroit because of interference from the Juarez and/or Bonaire stations. Nevertheless, the current news/talk format enjoys good ratings in Windsor, though it now hovers near the bottom of the Detroit Arbitron reports.

In May 2006, it was announced that CKLW would be a co-flagship station for University of Michigan football with Detroit radio station WOMC. CKLW had served as backup station to WJR previously for Michigan football when WJR was forced to broadcast Detroit Tigers games due to contractual obligations.

On July 12, 2006, it was announced that CHUM would be absorbed by Canadian media conglomerate CTVglobemedia (now Bell Media), the owner of Canadian television network CTV and the successor of CKLW's former owner, Baton Broadcasting. The transaction was consummated on June 22, 2007.

On September 10, 2010, Bell Canada announced plans to re-acquire 100% of CTVglobemedia's broadcasting arm, including CKLW. The deal was consummated on April 1, 2011.

=== CKLW-FM and CKLW-TV ===
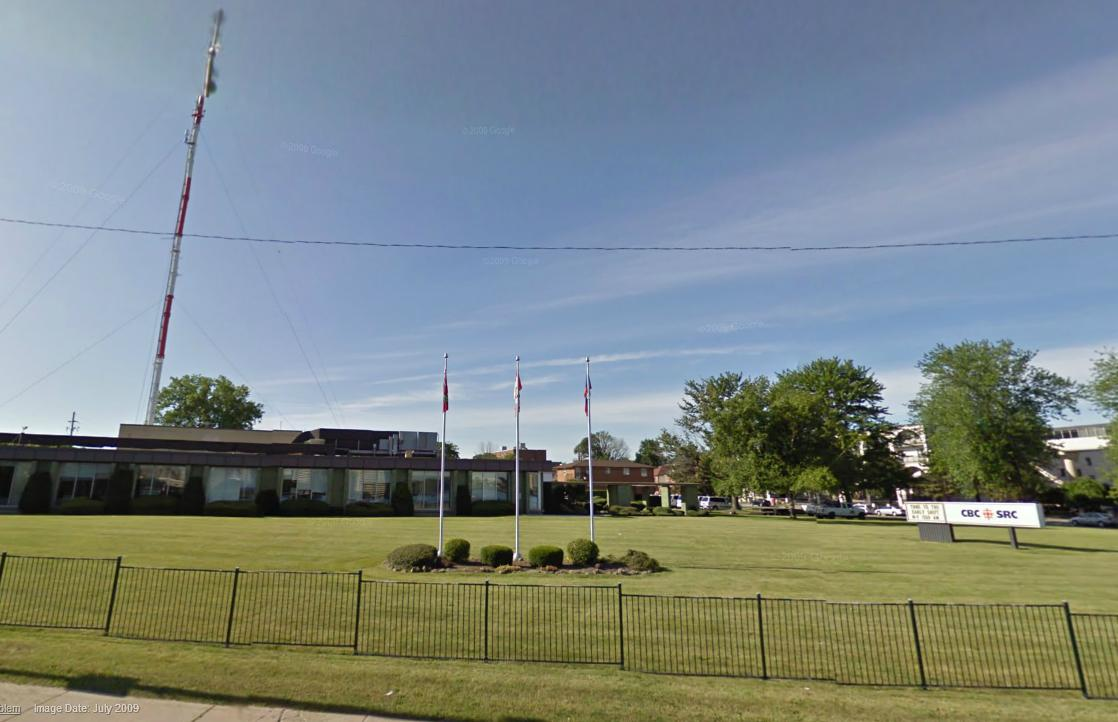
The present-day CBC studios on Riverside Drive in Windsor; until 1970, the studios also housed CKLW's AM & FM operations.

In 1948, CKLW started CKLW-FM on 93.9 MHz (now CIDR-FM). Despite a powerful 100,000-watt signal, CKLW's FM sister has never been able to attract a sizeable audience, at least not on the American side of the border. In the 1970s, CKLW-FM programmed a country format, and then big band and jazz as CKJY in the early 1980s.

After the failed "Fox" format, the station became beautiful-music CKEZ in 1985, and then in 1986, the CKLW-FM calls were restored and the station made an attempt to mimic the sound of the classic "Big 8" formula with a playlist spanning the 1950s through 1980s and with many of the original jingles, features and personalities, but it lasted only a few years.

In the early 1990s, CKLW-FM again tried the "Big 8"-style oldies format, as 93.9 The Legend. Though the sound was again very faithful to the original CKLW, it once again did not last long, as there was a lot of competition for the oldies market in Detroit at the time, with WOMC (104.3) eventually emerging as the most popular oldies station. (As of November 19, 2020, CIDR-FM became known as "93.9 Virgin Radio", airing a Top 40 format.)

The operation also included CKLW-TV, Channel 9 (now CBET-DT). For years, one of the TV station's most popular shows was an American Bandstand-style show called Swingin' Time (and later, The Lively Spot), hosted by Robin Seymour (and also Tom Shannon for a time) and featuring performances by national and local recording artists and teenagers demonstrating the latest dances. In fact, as early as 1956, Bud Davies hosted a "bandstand"-style show on CKLW-TV called Top Ten Dance Party. For the most part, though, CKLW-TV was overshadowed by its powerhouse sister radio station and mainly aired low-budget local shows along with Canadian Broadcasting Corporation (CBC) (and also CTV) network fare.

When the Canadian government requested RKO General divest itself of its Canadian holdings in 1968, the stations were sold to a consortium of the CBC and Baton Broadcasting, which was finalized in 1970. Baton ran the radio station (and CKLW-TV) for several years (under its subsidiary, St. Clair Broadcasting), before selling to CHUM in 1975. When the CBC took full ownership of the television station (CKLW-TV), it changed its call letters to "CBET".

CKLW-AM-FM then moved from the TV station's 825 Riverside Drive West location to its own studios and offices at 1640 Ouellette Avenue. CBET continues as Windsor's CBC English affiliate to this day, although recent budget cuts at the CBC have meant less local programming and more simulcasting of programming from Toronto. The Riverside studios would be sold to London-based Clayland Developments Ltd. in September 2014, though the CBC will be leasing space for their local operations. The 1954 building is on Windsor's heritage registry, meaning that it could not be torn down without approval by the city government.

CHUM's successor, Bell Media, continues to own CKLW and CIDR-FM today, along with modern rock station CIMX-FM (88.7 FM, "89X"). All three stations are located at the Ouellette Avenue address.

The 2004 film Radio Revolution: The Rise and Fall of the Big 8, produced by Michael McNamara and aired on History Television in Canada and PBS member stations WTVS in Detroit (2005) and WVIZ in Cleveland (2006), chronicles the history of CKLW's top 40 years. The film has been honoured in Canada with the Gemini Award (equivalent of an Emmy Award) for "Best History Documentary".

==== Echoes of the Big 8 ====
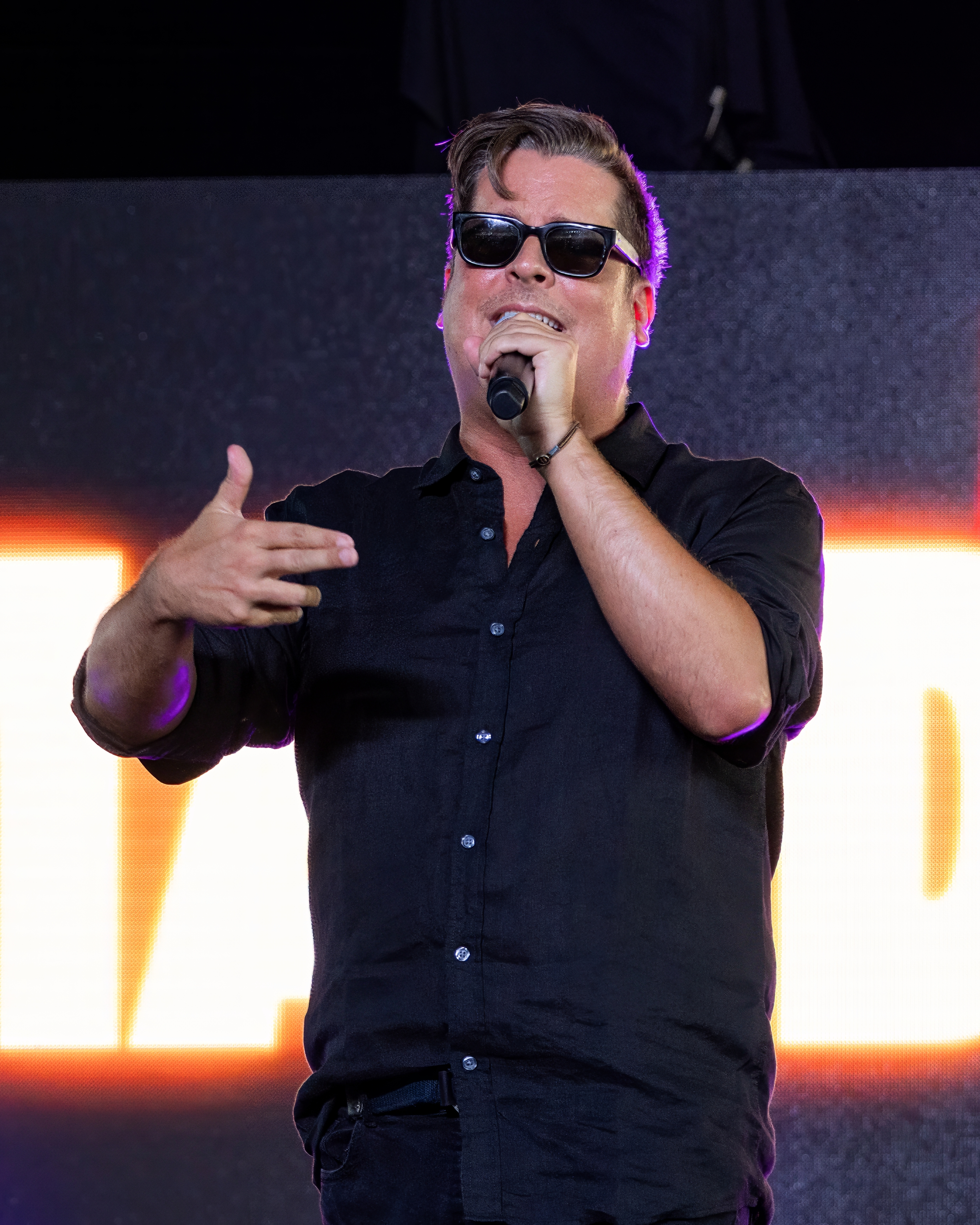
Dan MacDonald, host of the Dan MacDonald Show

In 2015, CKLW began airing its first music program, Hear + Now (pronounced "Hear and Now", formerly Into Tomorrow) in over twenty years (having switched formats with sister CKWW, becoming all-news in 1993). The station airs an alternative/independent local artists format, with some classic Canadian Rock songs with music from the 1960s to today sprinkled in. While not a full-time return to music, Here + Now airs, as of March 2021, on Saturday Mornings (it previously aired on Sunday Nights) making CKLW more of a full-service station again.

=== 2017 transmitter fire ===
On May 1, 2017, a fire broke out at the transmitter site, located east of Amherstburg (south of Windsor), knocking the station off air. Programming was temporarily moved to its then sister station AM 580 CKWW, while both stations' internet feeds remained unaffected. The cause is unknown, though the station was able to return to the air on its own frequency by mid-afternoon the next day at reduced power.

== See also ==
- RKO General
- Media in Detroit
