= Amy Wrzesniewski =

American organizational psychologist

Amy Wrzesniewski is an American organizational psychologist.

She attended the University of Pennsylvania before pursuing graduate study in organizational psychology at the University of Michigan, where she earned her master's and doctoral degree. During this time, Wrzesniewski worked with fellow researchers Jane Dutton and Justin M. Berg to create the Job Crafting Exercise.

Prior to joining the Yale University faculty in 2006, Wrzesniewski taught at New York University. At Yale, she started as an associate professor of management, and was appointed to a full professorship in 2015. She was named the Michael H. Jordan Professor of Management in 2018.
