= Teen Town (TV series) =

- Presented by: Robin Seymour
- Country of origin: United States

Production
- Running time: 30 mins. (approx)

Original release
- Network: syndication
- Release: 1965 – 1966

Teen Town is a Detroit based music variety show that ran in syndication in the mid-1960s. It was hosted by local DJ Robin Seymour. In its brief run, the show featured acts like The Supremes, The Temptations, Smokey Robinson and The Miracles, Marvin Gaye, Martha & the Vandellas, Stevie Wonder, and the Parliaments. Clips from the show are often used in Motown documentaries. Rights to surviving footage of the show are now owned by Research Video.
