= Swingin' Time =

- Opening titles for Swingin' Time
- Presented by: Robin Seymour; Tom Shannon
- Country of origin: Canada

Production
- Production locations: Windsor, Ontario, Canada
- Running time: 30 to 60 mins. (approx)

Original release
- Network: CKLW-TV syndicated
- Release: 1965 – 1968

Swingin' Time is a music variety show, similar to American Bandstand, hosted by WKNR (Keener 13, Detroit) personality Robin Seymour and also, for a time, CKLW radio's Tom Shannon. This show was broadcast on CKLW-TV Channel 9 (now CBET-DT) out of Windsor, Ontario, Canada, from 1965 to 1968, and also seen in a few other markets in syndication. The show featured recording acts, both nationally and locally popular, lip-synching to their latest releases while teenagers showcased the latest dances on the show's dance floor. In its brief run, the show featured well-known Motown acts like The Supremes, Smokey Robinson & the Miracles, Marvin Gaye, The Marvelettes, Martha & The Vandellas and The Four Tops, and non-Motown acts such as Bob Seger.

Rights to surviving footage of the show are now owned by Research Video.
