= Maloo =

Maloo may refer to:

- HSV Maloo, an Australian coupé utility made by Holden Special Vehicles
- Kurt Maloo, Swiss musician
