= Cosa resterà degli anni '80 =

Single by Raf

from the album Cosa resterà...
- B-side: "Sabbia nei bar"
- Released: February 1989
- Length: 4:30
- Label: CGD
- Songwriters: Raffaele Riefoli; Giancarlo Bigazzi; Giuseppe Dati
- Producer: Giancarlo Bigazzi

Raf singles chronology
"Svegliarsi un anno fa" (1988)	"Cosa resterà degli anni '80" (1989)	"Ti pretendo" (1989)

Audio
- "Cosa resterà degli anni '80" on YouTube

"Cosa resterà degli anni '80" ("What will remain of the 1980s") is a 1989 Italian song composed by Raf, Giancarlo Bigazzi and Giuseppe Dati, and performed by Raf.

The song was Raf's entry at the 39th edition of the Sanremo Music Festival, where it ranked only fifteenth. In spite of the Festival's tepid response, the song became a signature song of Raf and a generational anthem.

Raf recorded the song in Spanish as "Qué quedará de los '80". In 1995, Mina covered the song in her album Pappa di latte in an English-language adaptation, "When You Let Me Go". The song was included in the soundtrack of the films Volevo i pantaloni by Maurizio Ponzi and Notte prima degli esami by Fausto Brizzi.

== Track listing ==
No.	Title	Writer(s)	Length
1.	"Cosa resterà degli anni '80"	Raf; Bigazzi; Dati	4:30
2.	"Sabbia nei bar"	Raf; Bigazzi	4:23

== Charts ==
Chart (1989)	Peak position
Italy (Musica e dischi)	7
Italy Airplay (Music & Media)	18

== Certifications ==
Region	Certification	Certified units/sales
Italy (FIMI) Sales since 2009	Gold	50,000^{‡}
^{‡} Sales+streaming figures based on certification alone.
