= Robin Seymour (DJ) =

American DJ (1926–2020)

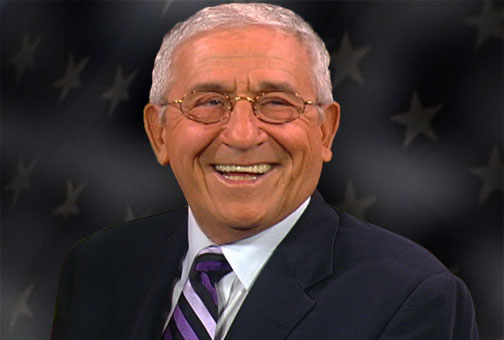
Seymour in 2015

Robin Henry Seymour (March 9, 1926 – April 17, 2020) was an American radio personality and disc jockey who worked at CKLW and WKMH. He was also the host of the television series Teen Town and Swingin' Time in Detroit. He started in radio as a child actor on the Lone Ranger Show and eventually became one of the country's longest-serving disc jockeys.

== Career ==
=== Early years ===
Seymour was born in Detroit, Michigan. In 1947, after a stint with the Armed Forces Radio Network during World War II, Seymour began an 18-year run with WKMH (now WDTW) in Dearborn, Michigan. He quickly became its most popular on-air personality. His disc jockey style appealed to audiences of different ages and ethnicities in the Detroit area.

Seymour's afternoon "Bobbin' with Robin Show" featured all the top records on the music press sales charts. He pioneered rock-and-roll on the Detroit airwaves before the Top 40 format emerged. In the mid-50s, Seymour was among the first of the nation's DJs to ask his listeners what they thought about new records. He was also one of the first white DJs in the city to play songs performed by African-American rhythm-and-blues and doo-wop artists. Seymour hosted "sock hops" and initiated commercial tie-ins with local record stores. He frequently hosted the "Robin Seymour's Original Rock 'n' Roll Revue" at the Fox Theater in Detroit.

In 1956, The Four Lads, accompanied by the Percy Faith Orchestra, recorded Seymour's theme song. Seymour helped introduce many artists via radio or stage. In 1953, Seymour was named "Disc Jockey of the Year" by Billboard magazine. The following year, he was given the same title by Hit Parader. In 1960, Seymour's show moved to the morning slot.

=== Teen Town ===
In 1963, Seymour and three business partners, including co-producer Art Cervi (Bozo The Clown), created Teen Town, a dance-party format similar to American Bandstand, with each show focusing on a different Detroit area high school. They secured advertisers and were eventually picked up by CKLW. A year and a half later, Teen Town morphed into Swingin' Time. The 30-minute weekday shows were broadcast live and the hour-long Saturday show was taped early in the day and aired at 3:00 pm.

=== Swingin' Time ===
Seymour continued his radio gig at WKMH through its transition to WKNR; however, after being given an ultimatum by WKMH to choose between his DJ job or his television appearances, he left the station to devote himself full-time to Swingin' Time. For a brief period at the end of 1965, Seymour was given radio slot on CKLW radio which he used to help promote Swingin' Time. He was the highest paid DJ in the US, with a then unheard of $100,000 per year.

=== Promoting local bands ===
Seymour featured several established artists on his show, including Frank Zappa and the Mothers of Invention, James Brown, Dionne Warwick, and Wayne Cochran. He also introduced artists including Stevie Wonder, The Four Tops, Martha and the Vandellas, and The Supremes. Seymour launched beautification projects around Detroit with a kickoff concert at Detroit's Cobo Arena.

== Later career ==
When Seymour left Swingin' Time, he was replaced by another popular DJ, Tom Shannon. The show ended in 1969. Seymour left both broadcasting and Detroit in 1980 and moved to the Los Angeles area where he owned a video production company until 2013. He later worked part-time from his home in Phoenix, Arizona, and attended Detroit disc jockey reunions.

Seymour died in San Antonio, Texas on April 17, 2020, at the age of 94.
