= The Captain of Her Heart =

Single by Double

from the album Blue
- B-side: "Your Prayer Takes Me Off"
- Released: September 1985; 15 November 1985 (UK)
- Recorded: 1985
- Genre: Europop
- Length: 4:02 (single version); 4:34 (album version)
- Label: Double City; Metronome; Polydor; A&M
- Songwriters: Kurt Maloo; Felix Haug
- Producer: Double

Double singles chronology
"Woman of the World" (1984)	"The Captain of Her Heart" (1985)	"Devils Ball" (1987)

Music videos
- "The Captain of Her Heart" on YouTube
- "The Captain of Her Heart" (US version) on YouTube

"The Captain of Her Heart" is a song by the Swiss duo Double from their debut studio album, Blue (1985). The song is a ballad about a woman who stops waiting for her absent lover to return. The single was an international success, reaching No. 8 on the UK singles chart and No. 16 on the Billboard Hot 100, thus making Double the first Swiss act to reach the top 40 on the latter chart.

== Background ==
Keyboardist Felix Haug had recorded a demo melody on his Oberheim synthesizer, "very '80s style", several months before Double went into the studio to record their first album. In the studio, singer Kurt Maloo heard this melody and was interested. The sound engineer suggested Haug play it on a grand piano, instead of '80s-style synthesizer, as a guide for Maloo's vocals. When the piano melody was recorded, Maloo wanted it left the way it was.

Maloo said in 2013, "I wrote the lyrics to the playback in no time in the studio. Like a ghost writer. They were just there out of the blue. It was almost spooky. I never thought the lyrics would touch so many hearts around the world and I'm still overwhelmed from all the positive feedback I get through the internet."

The prominent saxophone on the song was played by Christian Ostermeier.

== Reception ==
Jerry Smith of the Music Week magazine considered "The Captain of Her Heart" a surprising "Euro-pop number song that doesn't rely on a tasteless disco beat", and noted that the "sparse arrangement of synths and a recurring piano motif is competently put together behind a dramatic vocal". In a retrospective review of the song, AllMusic journalist Stewart Mason suggested that the song is "one of the great lost one-hit wonders of the mid-1980s." Mason wrote: "The Swiss duo never managed to capitalize on this song's casual sophistication and melodic grace, but it remains a glorious anomaly."

== Music videos ==
There were two different music videos produced for the song. The original Swiss version features the band performing the song in a darkened room. The US version of the video incorporates more of a storyline, with alternating location shots featuring the band members and various female models. A TV program incorporating elements from the US video made the band appear as having four members, with Felix Haug either playing drums or piano depending on the shot, and Kurt Maloo either playing guitar and singing or playing saxophone. Most shots of playing musicians just showed two of them at the same time, but a few were composite and showed all four. The original Swiss video uses a similar idea, but also sometimes makes two incarnations of the same artist appear together and does not attempt at realism. The album cover also represents each artist twice.

== Track listings ==
- 7-inch single (Polydor)
1. "The Captain of Her Heart" (single version) – 4:02
2. "Your Prayer Takes Me Off" (part II – dub) – 4:04
- 7-inch single (A&M)
1. "The Captain of Her Heart" (single version) – 4:02
2. "Your Prayer Takes Me Off" (part II – dub) – 4:04
- 7-inch single (Metronome)
1. "The Captain of Her Heart" – 4:35
2. "Your Prayer Takes Me Off" (part II – dub) – 4:04
- 12-inch maxi single
1. "The Captain of Her Heart" – 4:35
2. "Your Prayer Takes Me Off" (part II – dub) – 4:04
3. "Your Prayer Takes Me Off" (part I) – 6:30

== Charts ==
=== Weekly charts ===
Weekly chart performance for "The Captain of Her Heart"
Chart (1986)	Peak position
Australia (Kent Music Report)	64
Austria (Ö3 Austria Top 40)	15
Belgium (Ultratop 50 Flanders)	17
Canada Top Singles (RPM)	17
Canada Adult Contemporary (RPM)	4
Europe (European Hot 100 Singles)	19
France (SNEP)	9
Ireland (IRMA)	6
Italy (Musica e dischi)	3
Netherlands (Single Top 100)	37
Netherlands (Tipparade)	11
New Zealand (Recorded Music NZ)	32
Norway (VG-lista)	9
South Africa (Springbok Radio)	14
Switzerland (Schweizer Hitparade)	11
UK Singles (Official Charts)	8
US Billboard Hot 100	16
US Adult Contemporary (Billboard)	4
West Germany (GfK)	10

=== Year-end charts ===
Year-end chart performance for "The Captain of Her Heart"
Chart (1986)	Position
Europe (European Hot 100)	41
US Adult Contemporary (Billboard)	33

== Cover versions ==
The song has been covered by:

- Randy Crawford
- Laurent Voulzy
- Koto
- Roland Kaiser
- Contemporary jazz pianist Duncan Millar offered his take on the song his 2001 album Good to Go.
