= Naningo =

EP by Double
- Released: 1983
- Genre: Avant-garde, experimental rock
- Label: Metronome Records

Double chronology
Naningo (1983)	Blue (1985)

Naningo is the debut and only EP by Swiss band Double.

== Track listing ==
Side A
No.	Title	Length
1.	"Naningo"	4:30

Side B
No.	Title	Length
2.	"El Dorado"	3:30
3.	"Es"	3:33
