= The Americans (commentary) =

1973 work by Gordon Sinclair

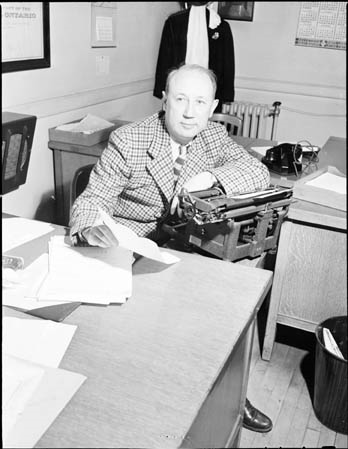
Canadian broadcaster Gordon Sinclair, author of "The Americans"

"The Americans" is a commentary by Canadian broadcaster Gordon Sinclair. Originally written for a regular broadcast on CFRB radio in Toronto on June 5, 1973, it became a media and public phenomenon. It was replayed several times a day by some United States radio stations and released as a hit audio recording in several forms. Ronald Reagan credited it for giving comfort to the United States in difficult times, and it was widely rediscovered and re-disseminated as the United States faced new crises in the 2000s.

On June 5, Sinclair discussed some stories from the day's news. Widespread heavy tornado damage afflicted the U.S. Midwest. The Mississippi River was in flood stage. The American Red Cross faced an imminent threat of insolvency. And the United States dollar reached very low levels, something Sinclair, an inveterate market watcher, was keenly aware of.

"The Americans" was not, as widely reported later, an angry response to countries that were criticizing the American failure in the Vietnam War. Instead, Sinclair's commentary stated that when many countries faced economic crises or natural disasters, Americans were among the most generous people in the world at offering assistance, but when America faced a crisis, it often faced that crisis alone.

== Recordings ==
=== Byron MacGregor / CKLW Radio ===
The editorial became a phenomenon on American radio after CKLW Radio news director and news anchor Byron MacGregor read Sinclair's commentary on the air. After CKLW (a 50,000 watt Windsor/Detroit powerhouse radio station) received many requests for it, a record was released by Westbound Records of MacGregor's recording, with "America the Beautiful" being played by the Detroit Symphony Orchestra.

By January 1974, The Americans record became one of the fastest-selling records in America, reaching sales of 2 million within a month of its release. The single eventually sold three and a half million copies in the United States, and hit No.1 in Cash Box, as well as No.4 on the Billboard Hot 100 chart. All proceeds from the record were donated by MacGregor himself to the American Red Cross. (This version reached No.42 in Canada.)

=== Gordon Sinclair ===
Gordon Sinclair's original recording was released as a record as well, with "The Battle Hymn of the Republic" in the background, and went to No.24 on the US record charts. This made the 73-year-old Sinclair the second-oldest living person ever to have a Billboard US Top 40 hit (75-year-old Moms Mabley had a Top 40 hit in 1969 with "Abraham, Martin & John"). The recording hit No.30 in the Canadian RPM Magazine charts.

In May 1974, Sinclair told The Globe and Mail that he was "sick of hearing" the recording and embarrassed by some of the inaccuracies it contained, but that he would still write the same editorial over again.

=== Tex Ritter ===
Country singer Tex Ritter also released a version of the track, which was issued just weeks after his death in January 1974. Ritter's version of "The Americans (A Canadian's Opinion)" made it to #90 nationally in the US, and #35 on the country charts. It was the last chart hit of Ritter's career.

== Charts ==
=== Weekly charts ===
Byron MacGregor

Chart (1974)	Peak position
Canada RPM Top Singles	42
US Billboard Hot 100	4
US Billboard Adult Contemporary	26
US Cash Box Top 100	1

Gordon Sinclair

Chart (1974)	Peak position
Canada RPM Top Singles	30
Canada RPM Adult Contemporary	38
Canada RPM Country	40
US Billboard Hot 100	24
US Cash Box Top 100	36

Tex Ritter

Chart (1974)	Peak position
US Billboard Hot 100	90
US Billboard Country	35

=== Year-end charts ===
Chart (1974)	Rank
US Cash Box Top 100	86

== Legacy ==
In 1981, when Ronald Reagan made his first state visit to Canada, he praised both Sinclair and MacGregor as figures who had given the United States an inspiring tribute in one of its darkest hours. MacGregor was also posthumously honored with the National Americanism Award.

"The Americans" performed by Byron MacGregor was widely revived on the Internet, on radio & television and in newspapers in 2001, following the September 11, 2001 attacks, and again in 2005 in the devastating aftermath of Hurricane Katrina. Some revivals of the message incorrectly stated that it was newly written as a direct response to the recent crises; in this question of its authorship alone, the address has become a part of urban legend.

== Responses to "Americans" ==
- Charles Ashman recorded a song of thanks in response, entitled "An American's Answer."
- Comedian Albert Brooks spoofed "Americans" with his recorded routine "A Phone Call to Americans."
