= Mummenschanz =

Theater troupe

Mummenschanz Mask Theater
- Bernie Schürch, Floriana Frassetto, and Andres Bossard in 1974
- Formation: 1972
- Type: Theatre group
- Purpose: Mask theater
- Location: Altstätten, Switzerland
- Notable members: Bernie Schürch, Andres Bossard, Floriana Frassetto
- Website: www.mummenschanz.com

Mummenschanz is a Swiss mask theater troupe who perform in a surreal mask- and prop-oriented style. Founded in 1972 by Bernie Schürch (August 3, 1944), Andres Bossard (August 9, 1944 – March 25, 1992), and Italian-American Floriana Frassetto (December 9, 1950), the group became popular for its play with bizarre masks and forms, light and shadow, and their subtle choreography. The name Mummenschanz (Pronunciation: [ˈmʊmənˌʃanʦ]) is German for "mummery", or a play involving mummers. Mummer is an Early Modern English term for a mime artist.

== Ensemble ==
- Bernie Schurch (August 3, 1944), Switzerland
- Andres Bossard (August 9, 1944 - March 25, 1992), Switzerland
- Floriana Frassetto (December 9, 1950), Italy/United States
- Philip Egli (October 24, 1966), Switzerland
- Sara Hermann (January 10, 1985), Switzerland
- Oliver Pfulg (May 28, 1985), Switzerland
- Eric Sauge (April 26, 1988), Chablais, Switzerland, Technical Director / Light Designer
- Christa Barrett (April 20, 1990), Switzerland

== History ==
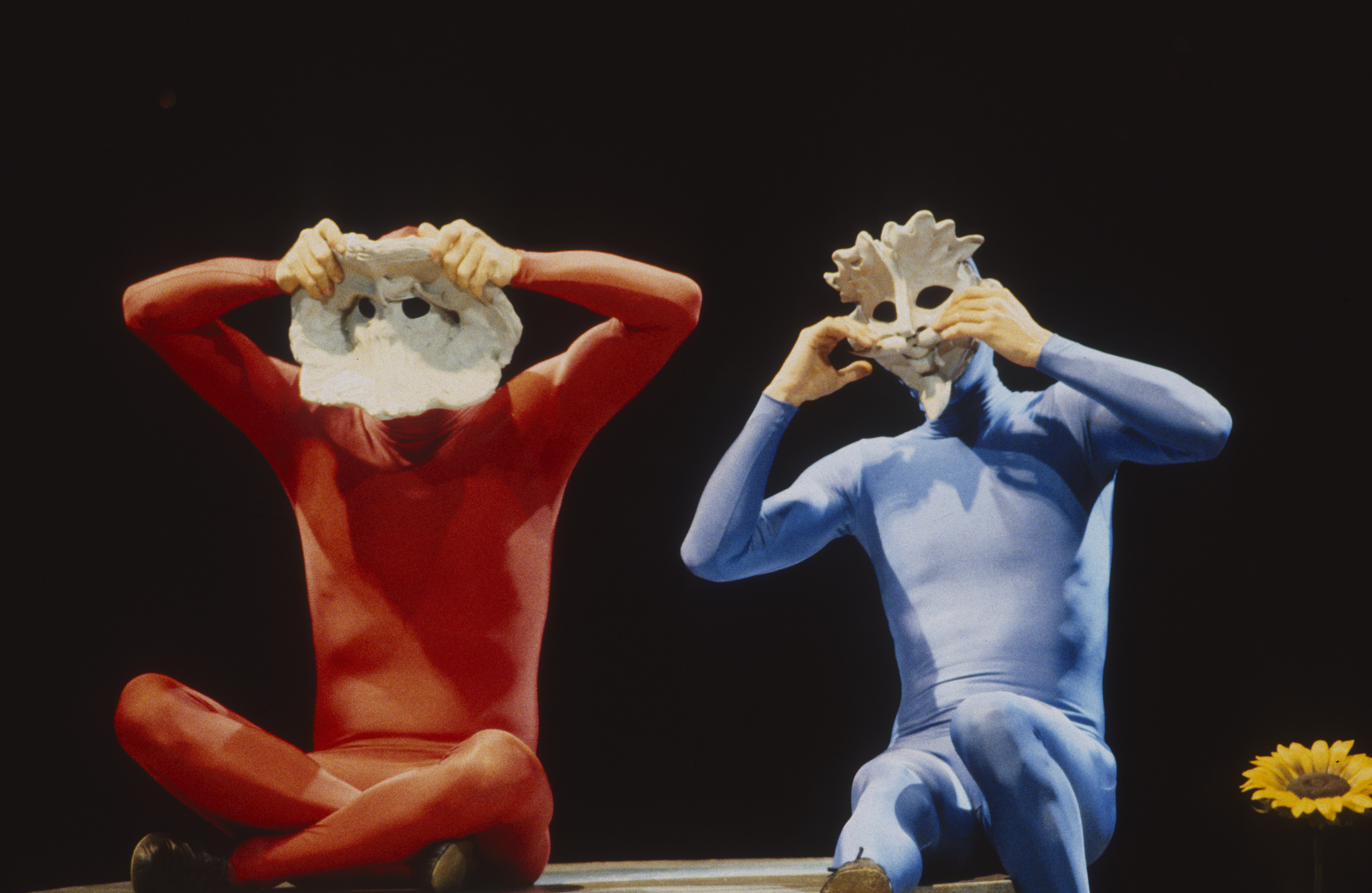
1988 at the Circus Knie

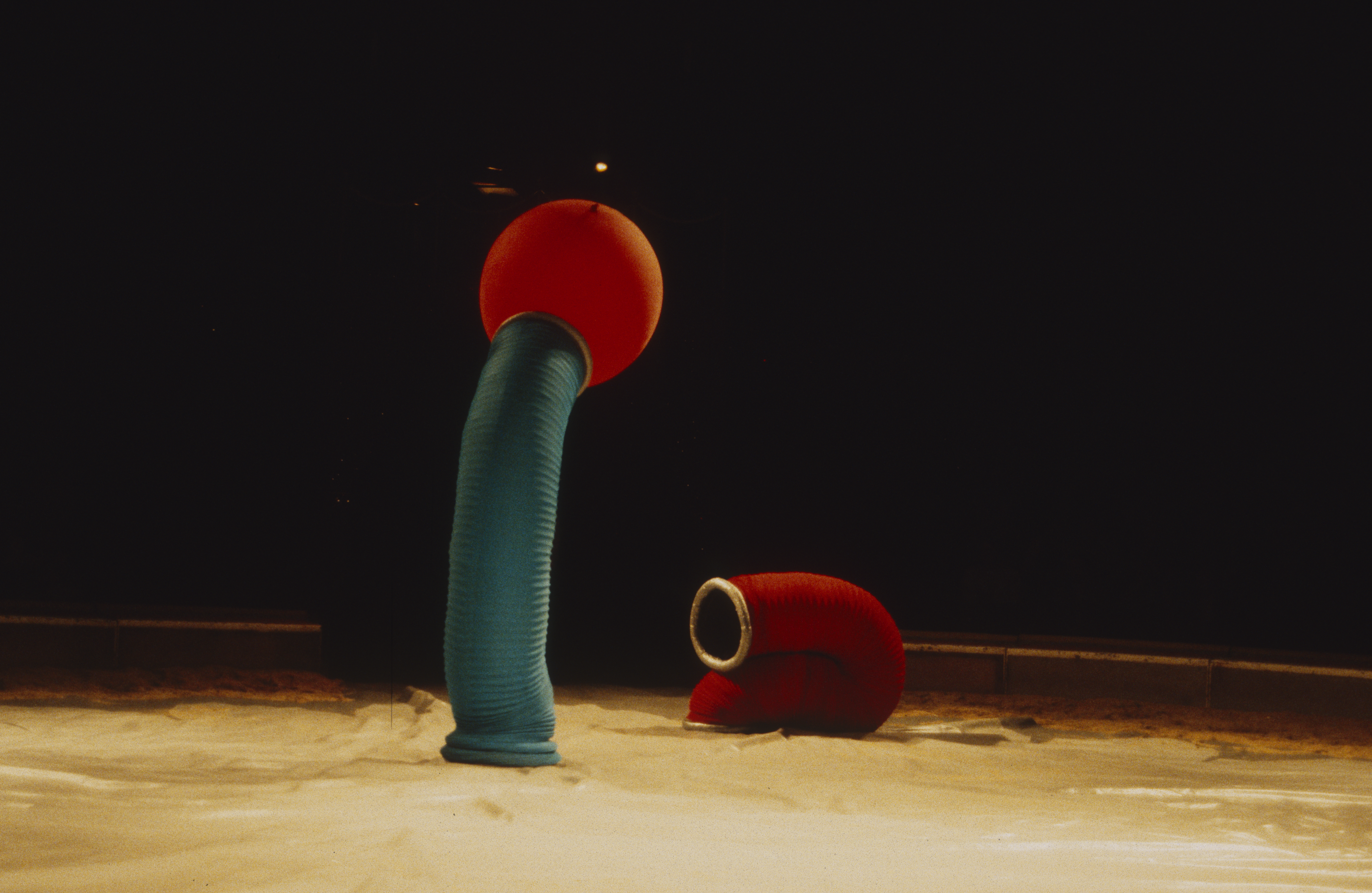
1988 at the Circus Knie

After studies with Jacques Lecoq in Paris and Roy Bosier in Rome, and following a three-year period of experimentation, the Mummenschanz Mask Theater was founded in 1972. In 1973, under the direction of producers Arthur Shafman and Robert B. D'Angelo, Mummenschanz toured the United States, Canada, Europe, and South America, and later enjoyed a 1,326-performance, three-year run on Broadway (1977–80). On March 4, 1977, Mummenschanz appeared on the Tonight Show. In 1986, they performed their The New Show at the Helen Hayes Theatre in New York. During this time they were spoofed on Late Night with David Letterman by Chris Elliott. They appeared as special guest stars on the last episode of the first season of The Muppet Show, which taped in November 1976. The troupe won the Rose d'Or for their TV production La Pomme in 1980. They appeared on Sesame Street. They also appeared on 3-2-1 Contact in the 1980s and Northern Exposure in the 1990s. On Feb. 6, 1986 they appeared on The Tonight Show on NBC. In 1987, Mummenschanz performed in the award-winning music video for "Devil's Ball" by Double (featuring Herb Alpert on trumpet). In 1992, Andres Bossard, a founding member of the troupe, died at age 47 from AIDS-related complications. Mummenschanz toured with American actor John Charles Murphy for the duration of Parade, their world tour beginning in 1995. Their next show was an anniversary programme called 40 years, and it presented the highlights of four decades of creative endeavors. In December 2016, Mummenschanz began touring Switzerland with a new program titled "you & me", created by founding member Floriana Frassetto.

== See also ==
- Mummers' play
- MOMIX (dance company)
- Pilobolus (dance company)
- Zentai
