= Jon Belmont =

American radio newscaster

Jon Belmont is an American radio newscaster. For twenty years, he was a correspondent for ABC News Radio in New York City. He was the morning anchor for AP Radio News in Washington, D.C. Now a retired newsie. His last dial position was at 1010 WINS Radio New York. Jon Belmont who as a teen at age 14 got his first start in the radio broadcasting business at radio station WWST in Wooster Ohio. During the July 4th 1969 flood in the Wooster area he stayed up all night answering phone calls from worried relatives who were calling the radio station for help.
