= Byron MacGregor =

Canadian news presenter and recording artist (1948–1995)

- Born: Gary Lachlan Mack; March 3, 1948; Calgary, Alberta, Canada
- Died: January 3, 1995 (aged 46); Detroit, Michigan, United States
- Occupations: News presenter; news director
- Years active: 1967–1995
- Known for: His spoken word recording of "The Americans"

Byron MacGregor (born Gary Lachlan Mack; March 3, 1948 – January 3, 1995) was a Canadian radio and TV news anchor, news director, and recording artist. He received a "LegendsInduction" into the Radio Hall of Fame in 2024. MacGregor had a number four hit record in 1974 on the Billboard Hot 100 with his reading of an editorial, "The Americans."

== Career ==
Born in Calgary, Alberta, he became, on his 22nd birthday, the youngest news director at station CKLW 800 AM in Windsor, Ontario, which also serves Detroit, Michigan, as well as Toledo and Cleveland in Ohio. This was during its "Big 8/20-20 News" period.

In 1973, he came across a newspaper editorial written by Gordon Sinclair of CFRB in Toronto, a commentary about America. MacGregor then read the patriotic commentary on CKLW Radio as part of a public affairs program. Due to the huge response, he was asked to record "The Americans" with the melody of "America the Beautiful" performed by The Detroit Symphony Orchestra as the background music. Both MacGregor and Sinclair released recorded versions of the commentary. MacGregor's version of the record (released on Detroit-based Westbound Records) became a bigger hit than Sinclair's in the United States, reaching #4 on the Billboard Hot 100 chart the week of February 9, 1974. It became a gold record. In Canada, MacGregor's version hit #42, while Sinclair's hit #30. MacGregor's recording has sold over three-and-a-half-million copies. All of his proceeds have been donated to the American Red Cross. MacGregor was honored with the "National Americanism Award".

MacGregor was known for his deep voice and high-energy announcing style at CKLW, and for writing copy in a manner that was compared to that of sensational tabloid newspapers. He later made the transition to a more traditional anchoring and interviewing style when he moved to WWJ Newsradio 950, the CBS Radio all-news station in Detroit, where he served as both a morning and afternoon drive time anchor during his thirteen-year career there. MacGregor also became the first newscaster in Detroit to simultaneously anchor prime-time newscasts on both radio (WWJ) and television (WKBD-TV 50).

By the mid-1980s, MacGregor held dual citizenships in Canada and the United States. He died on January 3, 1995, from pneumonia. His funeral took place at the McCabe Funeral Home in Farmington Hills, Michigan, and at the Shrine of the Little Flower Catholic Church in Royal Oak, Michigan. He was two months short of his 47th birthday. He was survived by his wife of 19 years, Jo-Jo Shutty-MacGregor. She was the first female helicopter news and traffic reporter in North America, and later worked for WWJ and WOMC as well as Metro Networks. MacGregor was also survived by his sister, Leilani Harvie; by his mother, Murdena MacGregor Mack; and by his brother, Hudson Mack, who was news anchor at CIVI-TV in Victoria, British Columbia.
