= Gordon Sinclair =

Canadian journalist, writer and commentator

Allan Gordon Sinclair OC FRGS
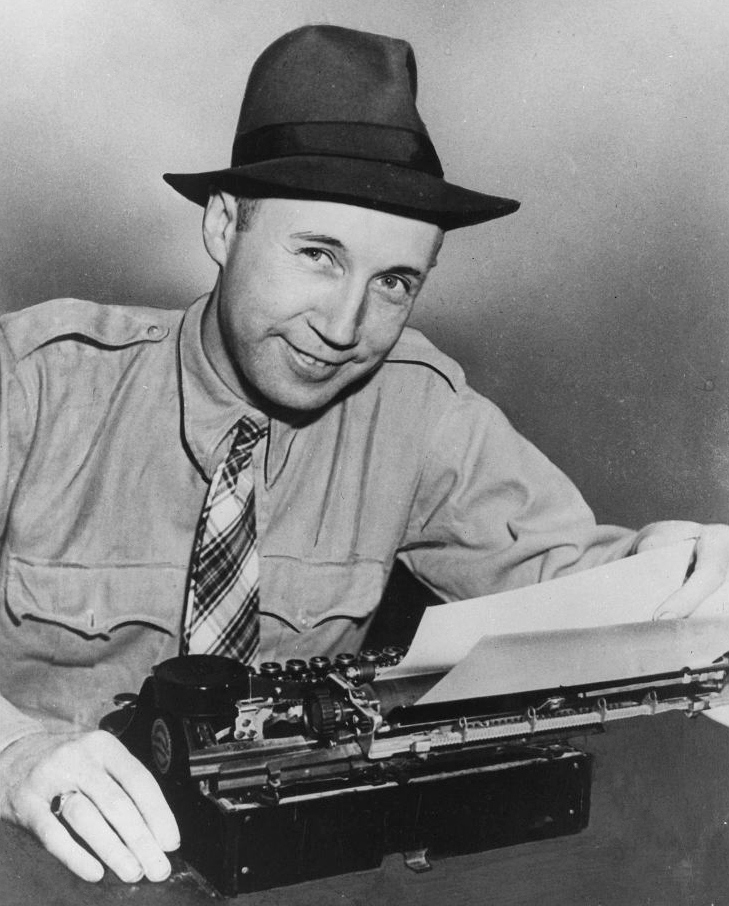
- Gordon Sinclair, c. 1930
- Born: June 3, 1900; Toronto, Ontario, Canada
- Died: May 17, 1984 (aged 83); Toronto, Ontario, Canada
- Resting place: Park Lawn Cemetery, Toronto
- Occupations: Journalist; writer; commentator
- Employer(s): CFRB, Toronto Star, CBC
- Known for: TV & radio broadcasts, "The Americans" commentary

Allan Gordon Sinclair, OC, FRGS (June 3, 1900 – May 17, 1984) was a Canadian journalist, writer, and commentator.

== Early life ==
Sinclair was born in the Cabbagetown neighbourhood of Toronto, Ontario, the son of George Alexander and Bessie Goldie (née Eesley) Sinclair. In 1916, before finishing his first year of high school, he dropped out to take a job with the Bank of Nova Scotia. After a few months, he was fired and started working in the administrative office of Eaton's. During World War I, he served as a part-time soldier in a militia unit of the 48th Highlanders of Canada. After being fired from Eaton's, he took a junior bookkeeping job with Gutta Percha and Rubber Manufacturing Company, starting in April 1920. It was there that he met co-worker Gladys Prewett. After an off-and-on relationship, they married on May 8, 1926.

== International reporter for the Star ==
Early in 1922, Sinclair applied for a reporting job at all four Toronto newspapers. The only offer he received was from the Toronto Star, where he started working in February 1922, hired on the same day as Foster Hewitt, who was the son of the Star sports editor.

Sinclair was given routine assignments at the Star for seven years before he received his first byline. His breakthrough was a series of articles written after living among a group of homeless people, whom Sinclair called "Toronto's hobo club" From that point, he rose to become one of the paper's star reporters, spending most of the next decade travelling the world, filing reports from exotic locations. During an Asian tour in 1932, he spent four months in India and, after returning home, wrote his first book, Foot-loose in India. It was published in October 1932 and became a best-seller in Canada, with the first edition selling out on the first day.

Before the end of the year, Sinclair announced that his next trip would be to Southeast Asia. A public farewell was held on January 13, 1933, filling Massey Hall, with the Star estimating that an additional 6,500 people were turned away. His experiences on that trip were collected in a second book, Cannibal Quest, which was a best-seller in Canada and also reached No. 9 in the U.S. Then came a series from Devil's Island, which was also turned into a book, Loose Among the Devils, published in 1935.

Later that year, Sinclair was fired by the Star after failing to get the story on the outbreak of the Second Italo-Abyssinian War in Ethiopia. The Star reported that he was leaving journalism to take a job in advertising. The Star wrote that he had travelled 340,000 miles in 73 countries for the newspaper. At the time, he was working on his fourth book, Khyber Caravan, based on his travels in Afghanistan.

Doubts were frequently raised by readers that Sinclair had actually experienced the incidents he reported. His Khyber series was so widely questioned that the Star assigned another reporter to investigate his claims.

Sinclair's time away from journalism was short-lived. Three months after joining the staff of MacLaren Advertising, he returned to the Star, this time as a sports columnist, hired shortly after the sudden death of sports editor Lou Marsh, who had been one of Canada's best-known sports journalists. According to sportswriter Scott Young, Sinclair's transition to sports was "monumentally unsuccessful."

After a year in sports, Sinclair returned to general reporting and late in 1938 he again went on an Asian tour. He remained at home during the Second World War and was not accredited as a war correspondent.

== CFRB and Front Page Challenge ==
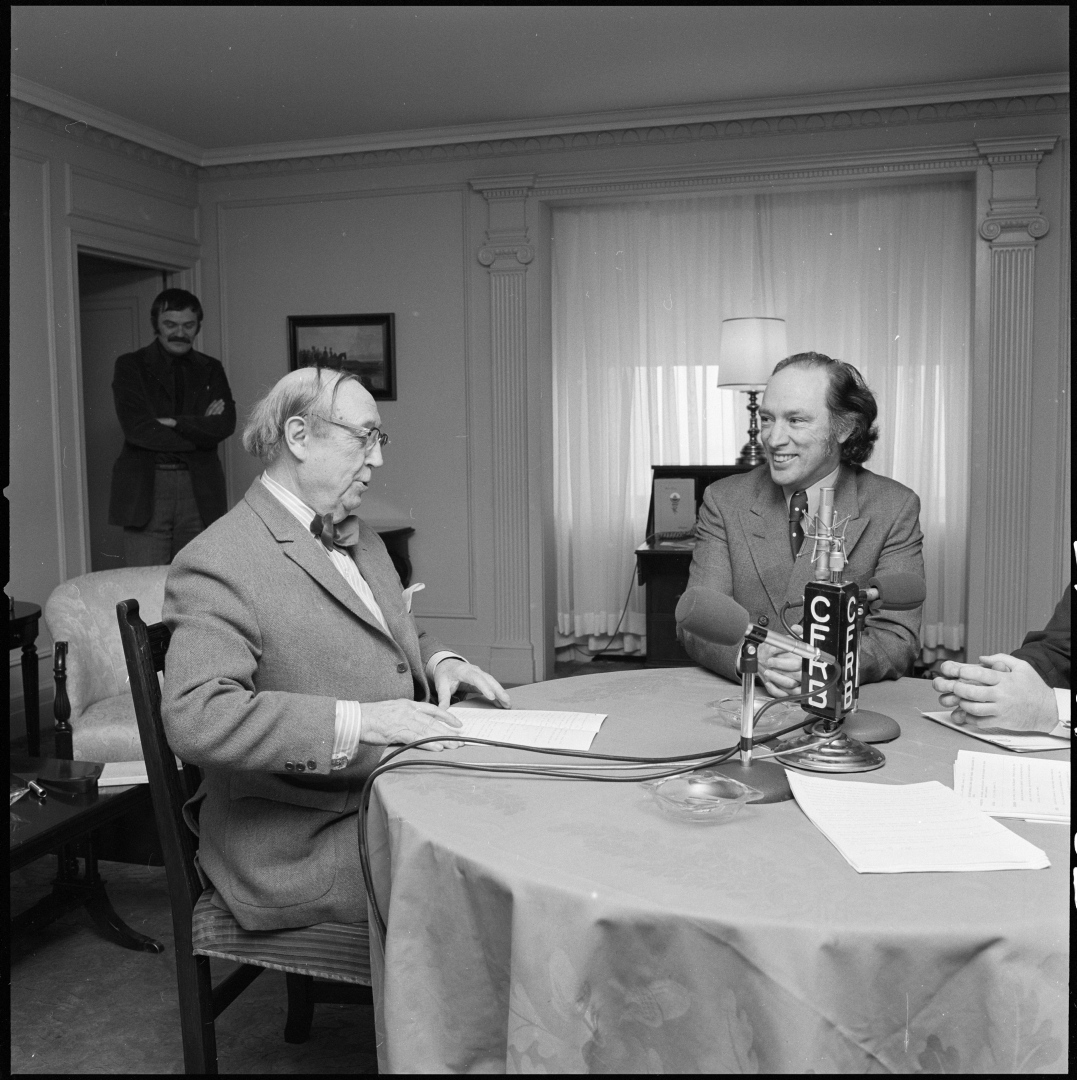
Sinclair interviewing Pierre Trudeau in 1972 on Let's Discuss It

Following the unsuccessful Dieppe Raid in 1942, Sinclair was asked by Red Foster, a news broadcaster at Toronto radio station CFRB, to provide some narration for a broadcast on Canadians at Dieppe. Sinclair ended up writing the story as well as reading it on the air, and continued to contribute brief reports to the station. Several months after he started, his radio work came to the attention of his bosses at the Star, which had a policy prohibiting its reporters from regularly writing reports for other outlets. Once again, Sinclair was fired.

In February 1943, he formally joined the CFRB team, becoming part-owner of the station the following year. He would continue to be associated with CFRB for over 40 years until his death.

He returned to the Star in 1949, this time as a freelancer, for one final international tour, which included his coverage of the end of the Berlin Blockade. He remained a contributor to the paper, writing a radio and TV column, until December 1962.

In 1957, Sinclair also began a career in television, as a panelist on the CBC Television series Front Page Challenge. He would hold that position for 27 years until his death. While Sinclair was often controversial, he caused an uproar in 1969 when he asked Canadian Olympic swimmer Elaine Tanner if menstruation interfered with her training.

Sinclair was a vocal opponent of water fluoridation (calling it "rat poison" in 1958), the singing of "God Save the Queen", medicare and taxes. Although he was raised as a Methodist and taught Bible class as a youth, Sinclair became a forceful critic of religion and the church. "I had 31 years of being a Christian, and it was enough," he said in 1969.

Sinclair had invested his earnings in the Depression-era stock market and was independently wealthy by the end of the Second World War. In 1960, he boasted that he earned more than $50,000 a year. By the end of his life, Sinclair reportedly had liquid assets of more than $2 million. He bought a Rolls-Royce in 1961 and drove it for 11 years.

Sinclair's autobiography, Will the Real Gordon Sinclair Please Stand Up was published in 1966, followed in 1975 by a sequel, Will Gordon Sinclair Please Sit Down.

== The Americans ==
On June 5, 1973, following news that the American Red Cross had run out of money as a result of aid efforts for recent natural disasters, Sinclair recorded what would become his most famous radio editorial, "The Americans". While paying tribute to American success, ingenuity, and generosity to people in need abroad, Sinclair decried that when America faced crisis itself, it often seemed to face that crisis alone.

At the time, Sinclair considered the piece to be nothing more than one of his usual items. But when U.S. News & World Report published a full transcript, the magazine was flooded with requests for copies. Radio station WWDC-AM in Washington, D.C., started playing a recording of Sinclair's commentary with "Bridge Over Troubled Water" playing in the background. Sinclair told the Star in November 1973 that he had received 8,000 letters about his commentary.

With the strong response generated by the editorial, a recording of Sinclair's commentary was sold as a single with all profits going to the American Red Cross. "The Americans (A Canadian's Opinion)" went to No. 24 on the Billboard Hot 100, making the 73-year-old Sinclair the second-oldest living person ever to have a Billboard U.S. Top 40 hit (75-year-old Moms Mabley had a Top 40 hit in 1969 with "Abraham, Martin & John").

A transcript of the commentary was also recorded by Byron MacGregor, news director of Windsor, Ontario, radio station CKLW (AM), and it became an even bigger hit in the U.S., climbing to No. 4 on the Billboard Hot 100. Sinclair was said to be annoyed by MacGregor's recording, which was released as a single before Sinclair's authorized version. At the time, CKLW was owned by Toronto media baron John W. H. Bassett. In Canada, Sinclair's version peaked at No. 30, topping McGregor's, which missed the top 40, stalling at No. 42.

In May 1974, Sinclair told The Globe and Mail that he was "sick of hearing" the recording and embarrassed by some of the inaccuracies it contained, but that he would still write the same editorial over again.

In 1981, when Ronald Reagan made his first state visit to Canada, he praised Sinclair as a figure who had given the United States a wonderful and inspiring tribute in one of its darkest hours.

"The Americans" was widely revived on the Internet, radio and newspapers in 2001, following the September 11, 2001, attacks, and again in 2005 in the devastating aftermath of Hurricane Katrina. Some revivals of the message incorrectly state that it was newly written as a direct response to recent crises; in this question of its authorship alone, the address has become a part of urban legend.

== Final years and death ==
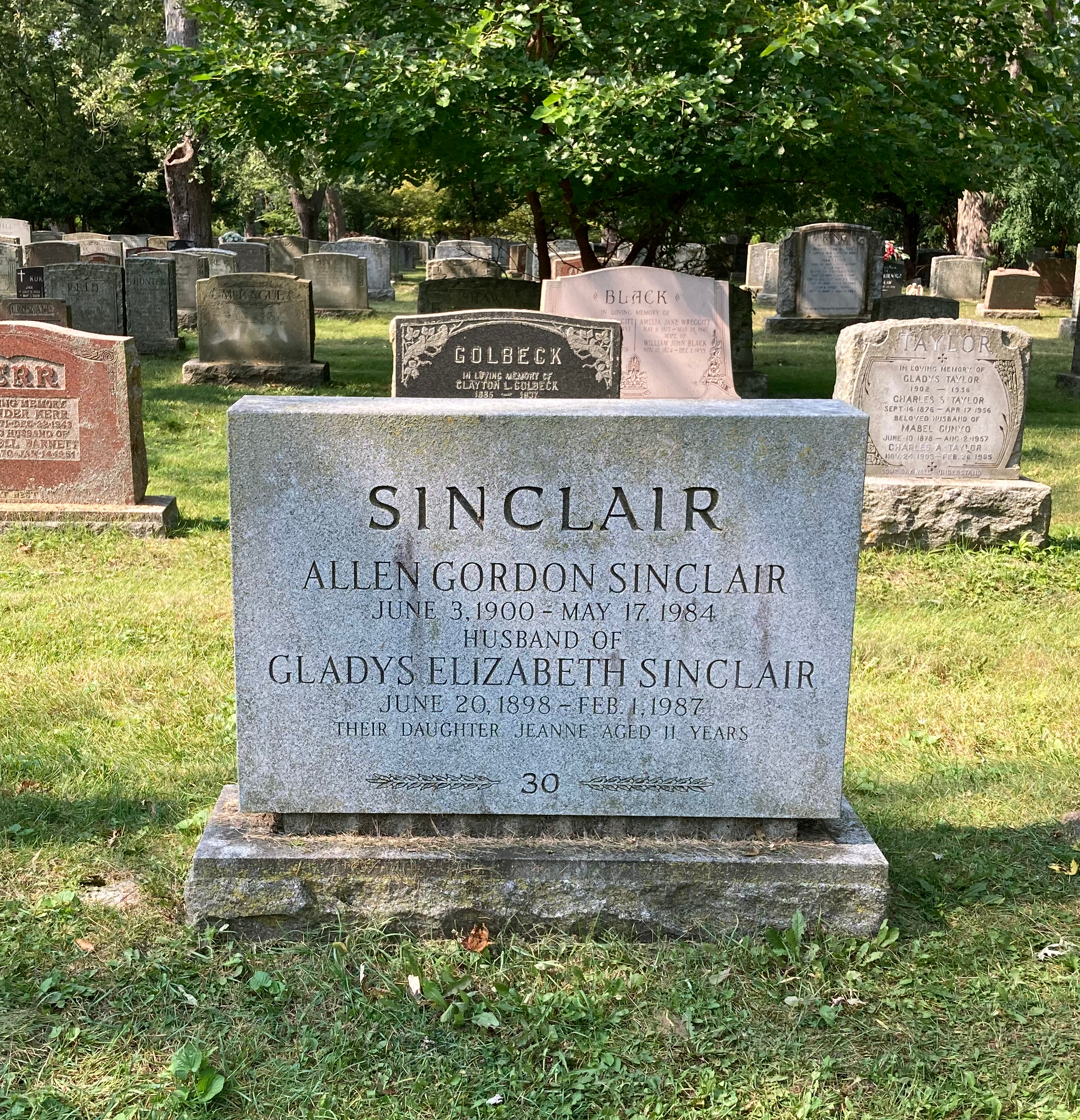
Sinclair's grave at Park Lawn Cemetery

Sinclair was made an Officer of the Order of Canada in 1979, and added to the Etobicoke Hall of Fame in 1984. Up to the time of his death, he was doing 14 broadcasts a week for CFRB and also appearing on Front Page Challenge.

In his final commentary, broadcast on May 15, 1984, he discussed passing his annual driver's test, which was compulsory for drivers over the age of 80. That day, Sinclair—who had had a series of heart attacks dating back to 1970—had a massive attack, going into a coma and suffering irreversible brain damage. He died two days later at age 83 after life support systems were discontinued. He was buried at Park Lawn Cemetery in Toronto.

Sinclair's eldest son, Gord Sinclair (1928–2002), was also a successful and respected radio journalist in Montreal, as well as the majority owner of CFOX (AM).

== Published works ==
- Foot-loose in India: adventures of a news chaser from Khyber's grim gash of death to the tiger jungles of Bengal and the Burmese battle ground of the black cobra. 1933. Oxford University Press.
- Cannibal Quest. 1935. Doubleday, Doran & Gundy.
- Loose Among Devils: a voyage from Devil's Island to those jungles of West Africa labelled "the white man's grave". 1935. Doubleday, Doran & Gundy.
- Khyber Caravan: through Kashmir, Waziristan, Afghanistan, Baluchistan and Northern India 1936. Simon & Schuster of Canada. ISBN 0-671-80178-3
- Bright Paths to Adventure. 1945. McClelland & Stewart.
- Will the Real Gordon Sinclair Please Stand Up. 1966. McClelland & Stewart.
- Will Gordon Sinclair Please Sit Down. 1975. McClelland & Stewart. ISBN 0-7710-8163-4
- Footloose: A Commentary on the Books of Gordon Sinclair. John Robert Colombo. 2008. Colombo & Company. ISBN 1-894540-65-4. 2014. Kindle Edition.

== Singles ==
List of singles, with selected chart positions
Title	Year	Peak chart positions			
Title	Year	CAN	CAN AC	CAN Country	US
"The Americans"	1974	30	38	40	24
