= Liz McComb =

Elizabeth McComb (born December 1, 1952) is an American gospel and blues singer, songwriter and pianist.

== Biography ==
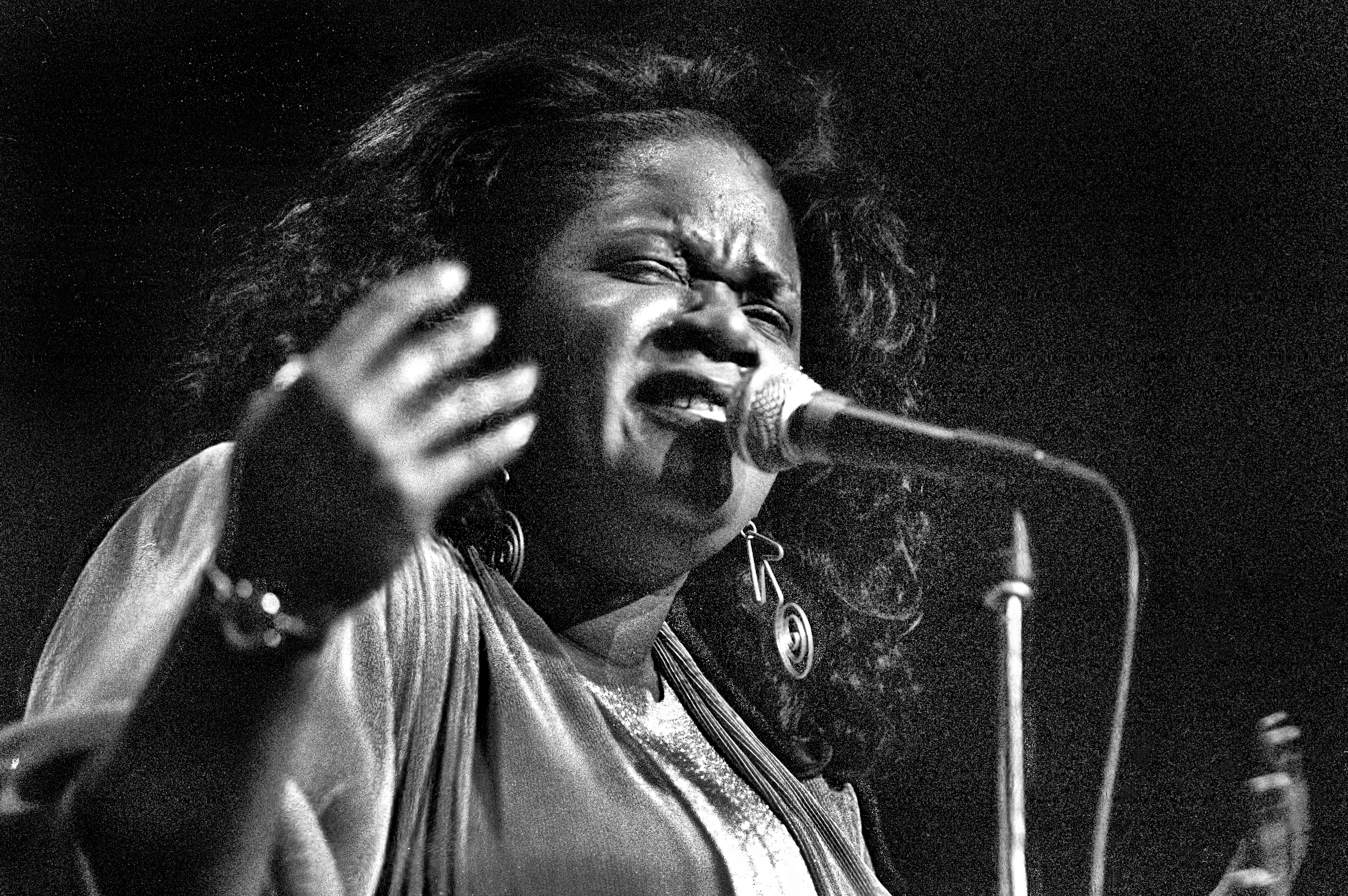
Liz McComb at Chicago Blues of Bagneux in November 1993

The sixth of seven children, Elizabeth McComb grew up in Cleveland in an African-American family that originally came from Mississippi. Her father, a factory worker, died when she was very young. Her mother was a preacher and the pastor of a Pentecostal church. Three of her sisters formed a vocal group called The Daughters of Zion that performed in local churches. Years later, they would sometimes accompany McComb during her concerts. McComb started singing at the early age of three.

McComb began with violin but decided to switch to the piano. While still young, she joined the Karamu House Theater school and then the cultural center's theater company.

McComb went to New York and started auditioning for shows and musicals. With the support of her cousin, Annie Moss, she toured in Europe as part of the itinerant "Roots of Rock'n’Roll" show. She regularly performed in Europe, traveling back to the United States several times a year.

== Discography ==
- Acoustic Woman, 1992, (Back to Blues/GVE) distribution EMI
- Rock my Soul, 1993, (Back to Blues/GVE) distribution EMI
- Live, 1994, (Back to Blues/GVE/licence Sony) distribution EMI
- Trilogy Coffret 3 CDs, (Back to Blues/GVE) épuisé
- Time is Now, 1996, (Back to Blues/GVE) distribution EMI
- Live à l'Olympia, 1998, (Back to Blues/GVE) distribution EMI
- Le Meilleur de Liz McComb, 1998, (Back to Blues/GVE/licence TF1 musique)
- The Spirit of New Orleans, 2001, (Back to Blues/GVE) distribution EMI
- L'Essentiel/FIRE, 2001, (Back to Blues/GVE) distribution EMI
- Soul, Peace & Love, 2007, (Back to Blues/GVE) distribution EMI
- The Sacred Concert, 19 Mai 2009, (GVE) distribution Naïve

== Videography ==
- Saint-Augustin – (solo & duo) Paris
- Olympia – Paris – DVD distribution EMI
- Vienne Jazz Festival – 1999 and 2002
- Parc Floral Jazz Festival – Paris
- Eglise de La Madeleine – Paris 1995 and 1996
- Basilique Sainte-Clotilde – Paris
- Eglise des Invalides – Paris
- Eglise Saint-Sulpice 2002 – Paris
- Opéra de Lyon 1994
- Athènes (Acropole)
- Festival de Fes avec l'ARC gospel choir
- Vittoria Jazz festival
- Quai du Blues/Nouvel Obs Event – Paris
- Bethléem 24-12-99
- Music Mania with 3 pianos ensemble
- Palais des Sports de Paris, HD (feb 2007)
- Festival de Coutances, HD (May 2007)
