= Kurt Maloo =

Swiss singer-songwriter and producer (born 1953)

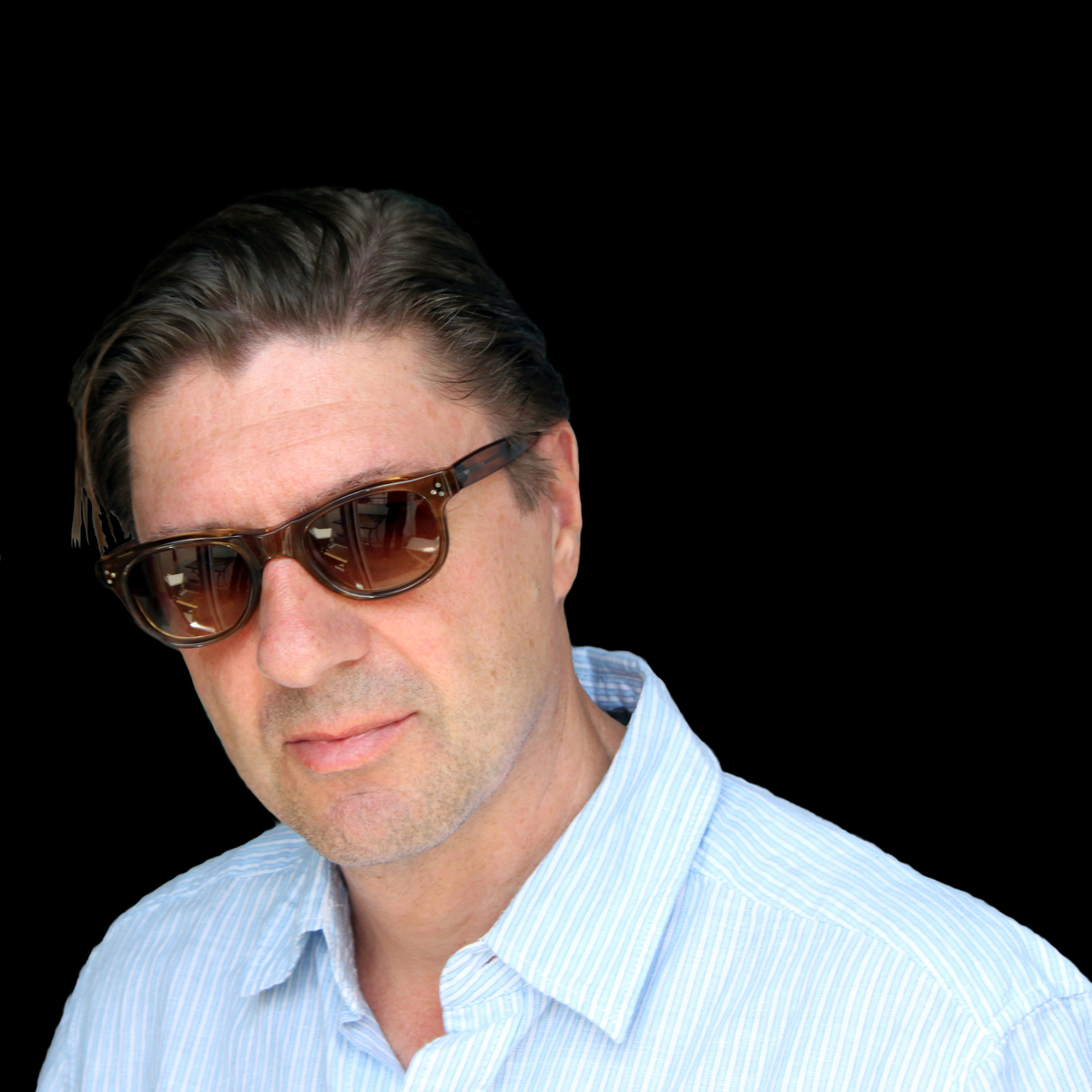
- Maloo in 2009

Background information
- Born: Kurt Meier; 16 April 1953 (age 73); Zurich, Switzerland
- Occupations: Singer-songwriter, composer, arranger, record producer
- Years active: 1976–present
- Labels: Philips Records, Sony Music, Edel Records, Verve Forecast
- Website: Kurtmaloo.com

Kurt Maloo (born Kurt Meier, 16 April 1953) is a Swiss singer-songwriter, composer, and record producer. He first achieved international success in 1986, as the singer and front man of the duo Double with the hit single, "The Captain of Her Heart".

== Biography ==
Kurt Meier was born in Zurich, Switzerland, as the only child of Arnold and Babette Meier. His father's family immigrated to France when Arnold was four years old. During World War II, his father returned to Switzerland, where he met Babette, a daughter of a locomotive driver, and married her. Her family was very musical; each played an instrument and performed at house concerts. When Meier was born, Babette used to play the mandolin and sing and dance for him, and later, when he started to play the guitar, jammed along with her.

=== The early days ===
At school, Meier was part of several bands that performed in local competition festivals, playing covers from the Beatles to Cream. From 1969 to 1972, he attended the Swiss Business School, but, after receiving his degree, chose a career as a conceptual artist and painter. He exhibited his works at local galleries in Zurich and founded, along with three artist friends, the performance group MAEZ.

At his own gallery openings, Kurt Meier, who changed his name to Kurt Maloo in 1975, always played the electric guitar. The solo performances metamorphosed into a band, including two other members of MAEZ, called Troppo. It grew to a nine-piece fusion art-punk band, influenced mainly by the New York Dolls and Funkadelic. After its first show at the Rote Fabrik in 1976, Troppo became a cult act in Switzerland in the mid to late 1970s.

In 1979, Kurt Maloo released his first 7″ single, "Giant Lady/Kontiki" on the new wave label, Forum Records. A year later, he teamed up with publisher Peter Zumsteg and released a hybrid format vinyl record with the title Luna, Luna + 7 Notorious Maloo Homeworks. On the a-side was one song spinning at 45 rpm and on the b-side, seven more at 33 rpm. The a-side song was a studio recording, while the b-side was recorded at home on his Revox B-77, using the ping-pong technique to simulate multitrack recording.

=== Ping Pong ===
He continued to play solo concerts until he met Felix Haug, later the other half of Double. Haug used to play drums with the Swiss techno band Yello. He joined Maloo and, with the addition of a bass player, they formed the trio, Ping Pong. With the help of publisher Peter Zumsteg, they got the chance to record four songs at the Roxy Music studio with guitarist Phil Manzanera as producer, but the tracks never got released. When they signed with Teldec's label Big Mouth, they re-recorded the tracks together with new material for their album From Exile (1982). The band played in numerous European festivals, including the renowned Montreux Jazz Festival.

=== Double ===
In 1983, Kurt Maloo and Felix Haug decided to make a go of it as a duo. As Double, they released three 12" maxi singles—"Naningo" (1983), "Rangoon Moon" and "Woman of the World" (1984)—before they had a chance to record their first album. The black-and-white music video for "Rangoon Moon" became a cult clip in Europe and received airplay on VH1 in the United States. Two years later, Double became known worldwide with their first hit single, "The Captain of Her Heart" from their first album, Blue, a best-seller that has been released in more than fifty countries.

In 1987, Kurt Maloo and Felix Haug recorded their second and last album, Dou3le, visualized best in the performance of the legendary Swiss mime group Mummenschanz in the award-winning music video for their song "Devils Ball", featuring Herb Alpert on trumpet.

Double started to work on a third album in late 1988, but, due to artistic differences, disbanded a few months later.

=== Solo career ===
Maloo continued his career solo again and released, under his own name, Single (1990), Soul & Echo (1995), Loopy Avenue (2006), Summer of Better Times (2009), and What About (2014). Since 2007, he has been performing with his own band and played several concerts and festivals, including NuNote Lounge Fest in Moscow.

=== Personal life ===
In 1986, Maloo met his future wife, Anja Müller, a fashion model from Hamburg, Germany. Together, they moved to Paris, France, where they lived for seven years and where their daughter was born in 1991. They then relocated to Hamburg, Müller's hometown, where their son was born in 1994 and where they still live.

== Discography ==
=== Solo ===
- 1979: Giant Lady (single) (Forum Records)
- 1980: Luna, Luna + 7 Notorious Maloo Homeworks (Recordz/Z-Music)
- 1990: Single (Philips Records)
- 1995: Soul & Echo (Sony Music)
- 2006: Loopy Avenue (Edel Records)
- 2009: Summer of Better Times (Verve Forecast)
- 2014: What About (CafeSwizz Productions)
- 2016: City of Rain (single) (CafeSwizz Productions)

=== Collaborations ===
- 1982: From Exile, Ping Pong (Big Mouth/Teldec)
- 1983: Naningo, Double (Metronome/PolyGram)
- 1984: Rangoon Moon, Double (12" maxi single; Metronome/PolyGram)
- 1984: Woman of the World, Double (12" maxi single; Metronome/PolyGram)
- 1986: Blue, Double (A&M/PolyGram)
- 1987: DOU3LE, Double (A&M/PolyGram)

== Videos ==
=== Solo ===
- 1990: "Lovegrow", directed by Alexandre Hotton
- 1991: "End of the Season", directed by Pascal Helbrock
- 1995: "Young King", directed by unknown
- 1996: "The Captain of Her Heart", directed by Frederik Boklund
- 2006: "Rangoon Moon", directed by Kurt Maloo and Dania Hohmann
- 2010: "Day of the Man with a Heart of Gold", directed by Christian Aeby
- 2014: "Come Over Here", directed by Bettina Schaefer
- 2014: "Never Give Up", directed by Bettina Schaefer
- 2014: "What About", directed by Kurt Maloo
- 2014: "Tumbling Skies", directed by Kurt Maloo
- 2014: "River Flow", directed by Bettina Schaefer
- 2015: "Drama Queen", directed by Adrian Heinrich
- 2016: "City of Rain", directed by pb
- 2016: "Don't Bring Me Down", directed by pb

=== Collaborations ===
- 1982: "Rhythm Walk" (Ping Pong), directed by Paul Grau
- 1983: "Naningo" (Double), directed by Sergio Galli
- 1983: "El Dorado" (Double), directed by Sergio Galli
- 1983: "Es" (Double), directed by Sergio Galli
- 1984: "Rangoon Moon" (Double), directed by Ernst Spycher and Christoph Braendli
- 1985: "The Captain of Her Heart" (Double), directed by Francis Reusser
- 1985: "The Captain of Her Heart" (Double), directed by Andres Bruetsch
- 1986: "The Captain of Her Heart" (Double), directed by Nick Haggerty
- 1986: "Woman of the World" (Double), directed by Andres Bruetsch
- 1987: "Devils Ball" (Double), directed by Hannes Rossacher and Rudi Dolezal
