= Justin M. Berg =

American Organizational Psychologist and Academic

Justin M. Berg is an American organizational psychologist and academic whose research focuses on creativity, innovation, and job design. He is an associate professor of Management and Organizations at the University of Michigan's Ross School of Business, where he also serves as Faculty Doctoral Coordinator. Berg's work examines how individuals and organizations generate, evaluate, and implement new ideas, and has been featured in leading academic journals and major media outlets including Forbes, The Atlantic, and The Wall Street Journal.

== Education ==
Berg attended the University of Michigan for undergraduate studies, where he received his B.A. in organizational studies and psychology in 2007. After a few years working as a research and development consultant, he attended the University of Pennsylvania for graduate school, receiving his PhD in management from The Wharton School in 2015.

== Career ==
After receiving his undergraduate degree from the University of Michigan, Berg worked as an R&D Consultant for the Center for Positive Organizations at Michigan Ross. During this time, he worked with fellow researchers Jane Dutton and Amy Wrzesniewski to create the Job Crafting Exercise, an interactive tool intended to boost job satisfaction by helping people redesign their jobs to better align with their strengths, values, and interests.

After receiving his PhD from Wharton, Berg worked as an assistant professor at the Stanford Graduate School of Business before transitioning to the University of Michigan's Ross School of Business. Here, he serves as associate professor of Management and Organizations and Faculty Doctoral Coordinator.

Berg's research focuses largely on creativity and innovation. He has published several studies in collaboration with author and leading organizational psychologist Adam Grant on topics such as "unanswered callings" and job titles. His work has been published in academic journals such as Administrative Science Quarterly, Academy of Management Journal, and Journal of Applied Psychology, and featured in publications like Forbes, the BBC, The Atlantic, The Wall Street Journal, Smithsonian Magazine, and Harvard Business Review.
