= Research Video =

Coordinates: 34.20355°N 118.39579°W

Research Video was a music footage library operating from North Hollywood, Los Angeles. The company was formed in 1984 by partners John Delgatto and Paul Surratt. Paul Surratt was also an ex-Shilos member, a folk group headed by Gram Parsons. John Delgatto left the company in March 1988 to return full time to his record label, Sierra Records. Paul Surratt owns the rights to an extensive collection of television and film footage dating back to the 1950s. Surratt's company also performs video restoration serving clients that vary from Dinah Shore and Perry Como to ABC and NBC.

A storage space owned by Surrat burned down near the headquarters of Research Video in 2001. However, the company's main archives were not affected.

Research Video sold all of its assets to Retro Video Inc in 2016. Retro Video Inc specializes in licensing of historic archival variety and music television clips to current productions and handles largely the same client roster as Research Video.
