= Double (band) =

Swiss music duo (1983–1987)

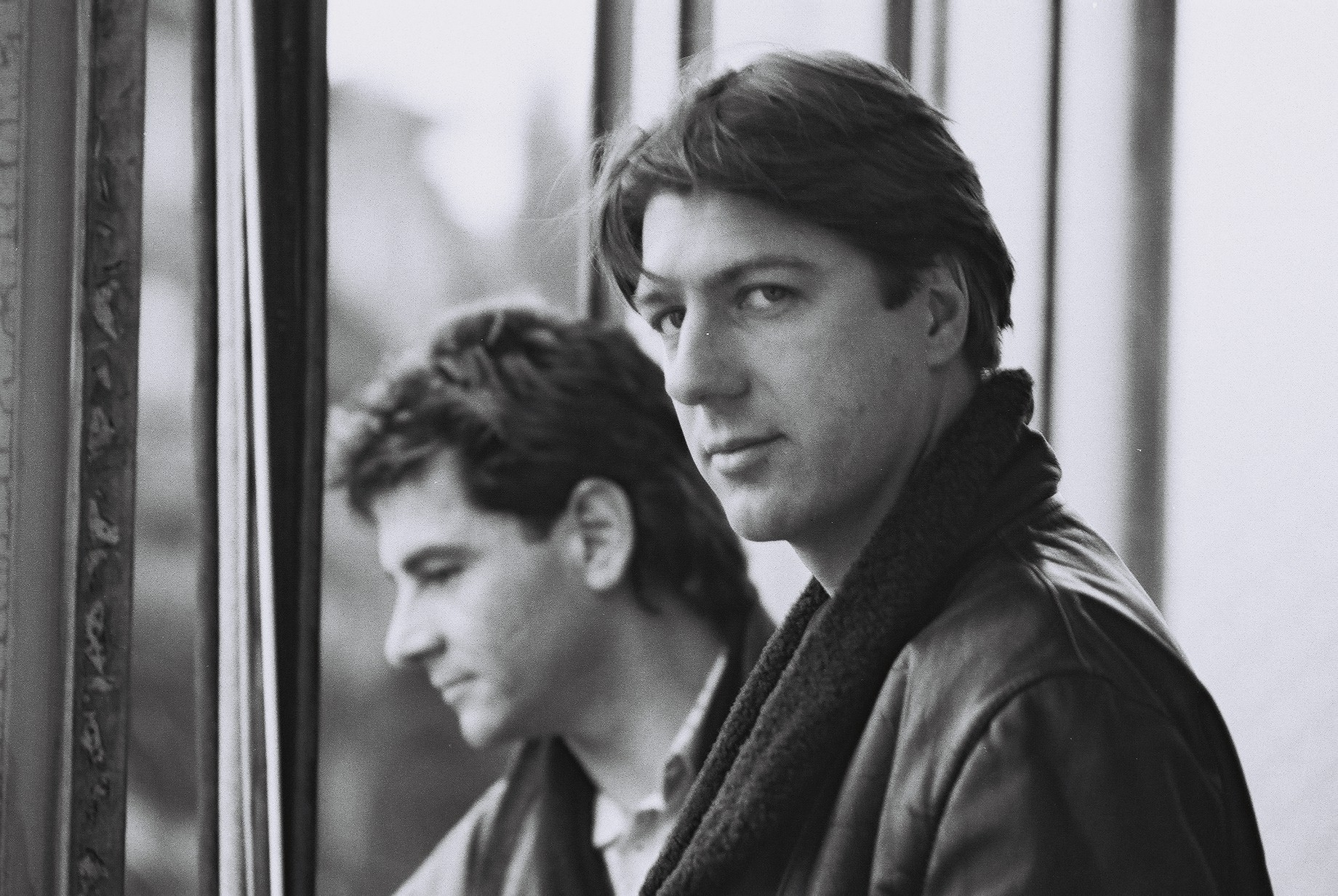

Background information
- Origin: Zürich, Switzerland
- Genres: Pop rock
- Years active: 1983–1987
- Labels: Polydor Records, A&M Records
- Past members: Kurt Maloo; Felix Haug
- Website: http://www.doublecity.com

Double (pronounced /'duːbəl/) was a Swiss music duo best known for their hit single "The Captain of Her Heart".

== Biography ==
The duo was formed in 1983 in Zürich, Switzerland, by Felix Haug (drums and keyboards) and Kurt Maloo (guitar and vocals) who were both members of the trio Ping Pong. Ping Pong formed in 1981, and had some early success with a single entitled "Rhythm Walk". They also recorded with Phil Manzanera of Roxy Music, though due to legal issues none of their collaborations were able to be released.

Ping Pong had some success with singles and several appearances around Europe in music festivals.

Prior to releasing their debut album, the duo issued a few singles, of which "Naningo", "Rangoon Moon", and "Woman of the World" were the most popular. The duo were initially into experimental rock with Naningo, featuring music unlike that on their later albums.

The high point of the duo's career came shortly after the late 1985 release of their first full-length album, Blue. The album contained two of the band's earlier singles as well as the international smash hit, "The Captain of Her Heart"; a plaintive, atmospheric ballad, which was an immediate success throughout Europe upon its 1986 single release. It reached No. 8 in the UK Singles Chart, and eventually hit the US Billboard Hot 100 at the end of the year, climbing to No. 16.

Their next album, Dou3le, followed in 1987, but, despite including the acclaimed single "Devils Ball", it failed to emulate the success of its predecessor. The pair began work on a third album, but split by early 1989 due to musical differences, though they remained friends. Haug began to compose music for films and advertising, while Kurt Maloo pursued a solo career, in the course of which he has released five albums – Single (1990), Soul and Echo (1995), Loopy Avenue (2006), Summer of Better Times (2009) and What About (2014).

During the late 1990s the pair reunited in Can Studio in Cologne to record nine new tracks. The duo were happy with the results, but it was felt there was not enough material for an album, and the project was postponed. In 2003, for the 20th anniversary of the band, the pair attempted to complete the project; however, Felix Haug died following a heart attack on 1 May 2004. Maloo took the results of this session and gave the tracks to Pit Baumgartner for remixing. These were included on Maloo's 2006 album Loopy Avenue.

== Members ==
- Kurt Maloo – vocals, acoustic guitar (1983–1987)
- Felix Haug – drums, keyboards, piano (1983–1987) (died 2004)

== Discography ==
=== Albums ===
Year	Title	Peak chart positions						
Year	Title	AUS	AUT	CAN	GER	SWI	UK	US
1985	Blue	71	15	30	14	2	69	30
1987	Dou3le	—	—	—	—	9	—	—
"—" denotes releases that did not chart or were not released

=== Singles ===
Year	Single	Peak chart positions											
Year	Single	AUS	AUT	CAN	BE	FR	GER	IT	NOR	SA	SWI	UK	US
1983	Naningo (EP)	—	—	—	—	—	—	—	—	—	—	—	—
1984	"Rangoon Moon"	—	—	—	—	—	—	—	—	—	—	—	—
1984	"Woman of the World"	—	—	—	—	—	—	—	—	—	—	—	—
1985	"The Captain of Her Heart"	64	15	17	17	9	10	3	9	14	11	8	16
1985	"Your Prayer Takes Me Off"	—	—	—	—	—	—	—	—	—	—	91	—
1986	"Tomorrow"	—	—	—	—	—	—	—	—	—	—	—	—
1987	"Devils Ball"	—	—	—	30	—	—	—	—	—	—	71	—
1987	"Gliding"	—	—	—	—	—	—	—	—	—	—	—	—
"—" denotes releases that did not chart or were not released
