= Felix Haug =

Swiss drummer and keyboardist

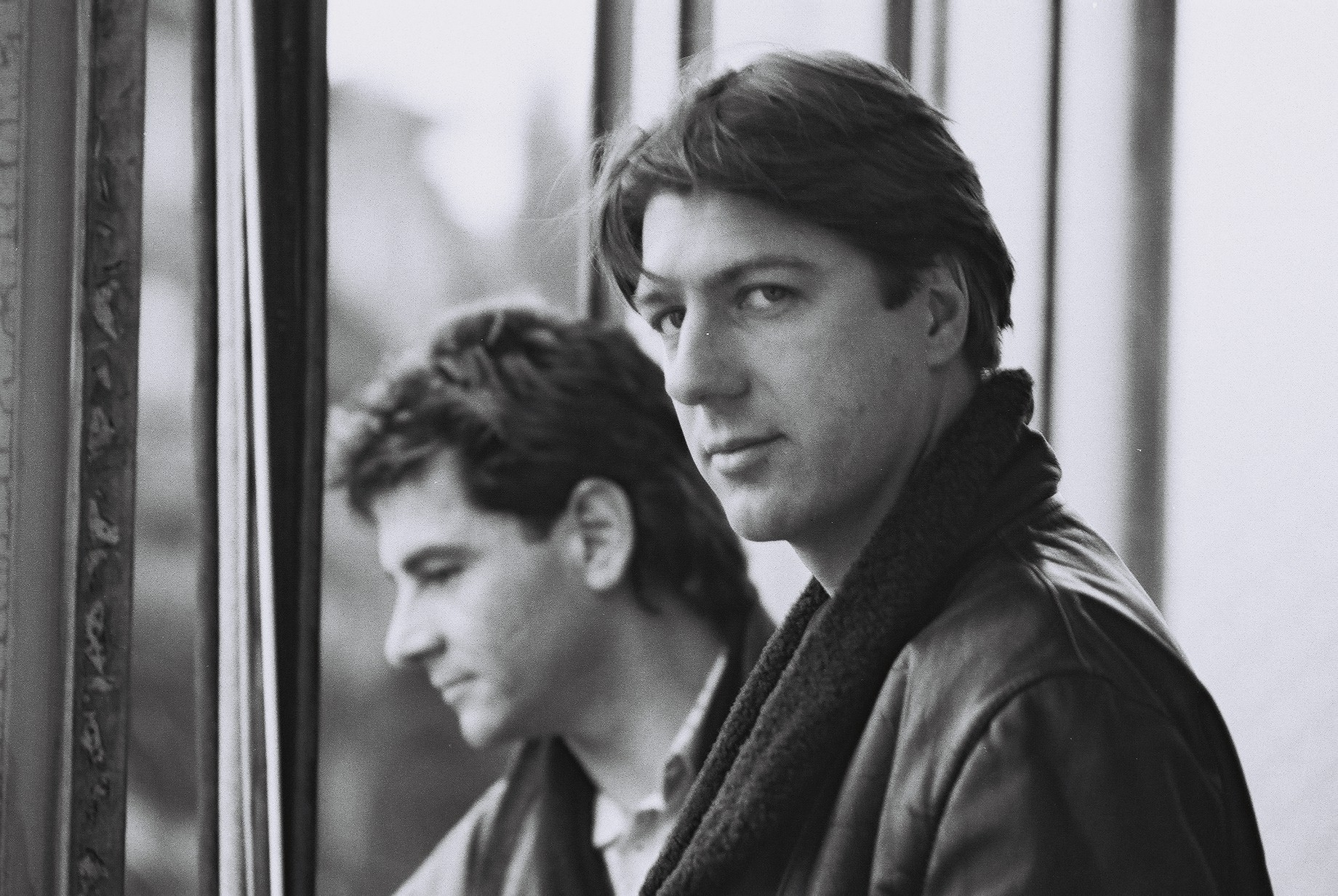
- Haug (left) with Kurt Maloo, 1986

Background information
- Born: 27 March 1952; Zurich, Switzerland
- Died: 1 May 2004 (aged 52); Uster, Switzerland
- Genres: Pop rock, jazz
- Occupation: Musician
- Instrument(s): Drums, keyboards

Felix Haug (27 March 1952 – 1 May 2004) was a Swiss musician. He was the drummer and keyboardist for the band Double. Before Double, Haug and singer/guitarist Kurt Maloo were members of a trio called Ping Pong. After their bassist left, Haug and Maloo formed Double.

Haug had three children with his wife, Vera. He died of a heart attack in 2004.
