= Mass media in Detroit =

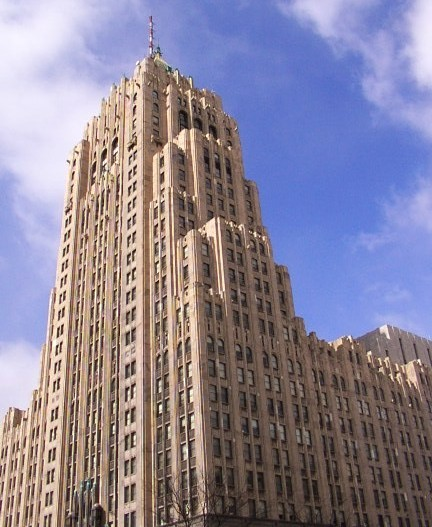
The Fisher Building, a National Historic site in the City's New Center area, is home to the Fisher Theatre, with an antenna that transmits WJR’s signal to its transmitter, along with the studios for WJR, WDVD and WUFL.

As the world's traditional automotive center, Detroit, Michigan, is an important source for business news. The Detroit media are active in the community through such efforts as the Detroit Free Press high school journalism program and the Old Newsboys' Goodfellow Fund of Detroit. Wayne State University offers a widely respected journalism program.

== Print ==
The daily newspapers serving Detroit are the Detroit Free Press and The Detroit News, both broadsheet publications that are published together under a joint operating agreement. Both the Free Press and the News are owned by the USA Today Co. Other publications include weekly, monthly, and quarterly alternative media publications.

=== Daily ===
- Detroit Free Press
- The Detroit News

=== Weekly ===
- Between the Lines
- Crain's Detroit Business
- The Detroit Jewish News
- Latino Detroit
- Metro Times
- Michigan Chronicle
- Model D Media
- Detour Detroit
- Downtown (Detroit) Monitor

=== Monthly ===
- DBusiness
- Detroit Home
- Hour Detroit
- Metro Detroit Bride
- Outlier Media
- BLAC Detroit Magazine
- Metro Parent

TBD Magazine The HUB Detroit

=== Bi-monthly ===
- Ambassador

=== Quarterly ===
- INSPIREbride

=== Periodical ===
- Fifth Estate
- The Furnace

=== Defunct ===
- Clear
- Detroit Journal
- Detroit Mirror
- Detroit Sunday Journal
- Detroit Times
- Detroit Tribune
- The Michigan Citizen
- Orbit Magazine
- StyleLine
- Suznanie
- Real Detroit Weekly

== Radio ==
Metro Detroit is currently the 12th largest radio market in the United States, as ranked by Nielsen Media Research; this ranking does not take into account Canadian audiences.

(*) - indicates a non-commercial station.

=== AM ===
- 560 WRDT Monroe (Christian radio) (simulcast on WMUZ-HD3)
- 680 WNZK Dearborn Heights (Ethnic/talk) (Note: Frequency is only used during nighttime hours.)
- 690 WNZK Dearborn Heights (Ethnic/talk) (Note: Daytime-only station.)
- 760 WJR Detroit (News/Talk) (Note: Clear-channel station.) (simulcast on WDVD-HD2)
- 910 WFDF Farmington Hills (Talk radio) (simulcast on WOMC-HD2)
- 950 WWJ Detroit (All-news radio/ABC) (simulcast on WXYT-HD2)
- 990 WDEO Ypsilanti (Catholic)*
- 1030 WKEG Sterling Heights (Relevant Radio)*
- 1050 WTKA Ann Arbor (Sports)
- 1090 WCAR Livonia (Regional Mexican)
- 1130 WDFN Detroit (All-news/BIN)
- 1200 WMUZ Taylor (Religious radio)
- 1270 WXYT Detroit (Sports/The Bet) (simulcast on WXYT-HD3)
- 1310 WDTW Dearborn (Regional Mexican)
- 1340 WCHB Royal Oak (Gospel) (simulcast on WMUZ-HD2)
- 1400 WDTK Detroit (Conservative talk)
- 1440 WMKM Inkster (Urban gospel)
- 1460 WPON Walled Lake (Oldies)
- 1500 WLQV Detroit (Christian radio)

=== FM ===
- 88.1 WHPR Highland Park (Note: Signal covers Highland Park and parts of Downtown Detroit) (Urban oldies/talk)*
- 88.1 WBFH Bloomfield Hills (Note: Signal covers northern suburbs) (Campus/variety)*
- 88.1 WSDP Plymouth (Note: Signal covers western suburbs) (Campus/AC)*
- 88.1 WSMF Monroe (Note: Signal covers Monroe and southern suburbs) (Christian contemporary)*
- 88.3 WSHJ Southfield (Note: Signal covers Southfield and the northern portion of Detroit) (Campus/urban)*
- 88.3 WXOU Auburn Hills (Note: Signal covers the northeastern portion of Oakland County) (Campus/variety)*
- 88.3 WCBN-FM Ann Arbor (Note: Signal covers Ann Arbor and southwestern suburbs) (Campus/freeform)*
- 89.1 WPHS Warren (Note: Signal covers northeastern suburbs) (Campus/variety)*
- 89.1 WEMU Ypsilanti (Jazz/Blues/AAA)*
- 89.3 WBLD Orchard Lake (Campus/variety)*
- 89.5 WOVI Novi (Campus/variety)*
- 89.5 WAHS Auburn Hills (Campus/variety)*
- 90.3 KDTI Rochester Hills (K-Love Christmas)*
- 90.9 WRCJ Detroit (Classical/jazz)*
- 91.7 WUOM Ann Arbor (Michigan Public/NPR)*
- 92.3 WMXD Detroit (Urban AC)
- 93.1 WUFL Detroit (Christian)
- 93.5 WHMI Howell (Classic hits)
- 94.3 WERW Monroe (AC/classic hits)
- 94.7 WCSX Birmingham (Classic rock)
- 95.5 WKQI Detroit (Contemporary hit radio)
- 96.3 WDVD Detroit (Hot AC)
- 97.1 WXYT-FM Detroit (Sports)
- 97.9 WJLB Detroit (Urban contemporary)
- 98.7 WDZH Detroit (Alternative rock)
- 99.5 WYCD Detroit (Country)
- 100.3 WNIC Dearborn (Adult contemporary)
- 101.1 WRIF Detroit (Active rock)
- 101.9 WDET Detroit (NPR)*
- 102.7 WDKL Mount Clemens (K-Love)*
- 103.5 WMUZ-FM Detroit (Christian)
- 104.3 WOMC Detroit (Classic hits)
- 105.1 WMGC-FM Detroit (Classic hip hop)
- 105.9 WDMK Detroit (Urban AC)
- 106.7 WLLZ Detroit (Classic rock)
- 107.1 WQKL Ann Arbor (AAA)
- 107.5 WGPR Detroit (Mainstream urban)

=== LPFM ===
- 96.7 WNUC-LP Detroit (Note: Signal covers parts of Downtown Detroit) (Community)*
- 100.7 WFCB-LP Ferndale (Note: Signal covers Oak Park, Royal Oak and parts of Downtown Detroit) (Community)*

=== Canadian AM ===
- 580 CKWW Windsor (Oldies)
- 800 CKLW Windsor (Talk radio)
- 1550 CBEF Windsor (Note: CBC/Radio-Canada station) (Ici Radio-Canada Première)*

=== Canadian FM ===
- 88.7 CIMX-FM Windsor (Modern Rock)
- 89.9 CBE-FM Windsor (CBC Music)*
- 93.9 CIDR-FM Windsor (Contemporary hit radio)
- 95.9 CJWF-FM Windsor (Country)
- 96.7 CHYR-FM Leamington (Hot AC)
- 97.5 CBEW-FM Windsor (CBC Radio One)*
- 99.1 CJAM-FM Windsor (Campus/variety)*
- 100.7 CKUE-FM-1 (Note: Rebroadcaster of Chatham-Kent station CKUE-FM) Windsor (Adult hits)
- 102.3 CINA-FM Windsor (Multilingual)
- 103.9 CJBC-FM-1 (Note: Rebroadcaster of Toronto station CJBC-FM) Windsor (Ici Musique)*
- 105.5 CBEF-2-FM (Note: Rebroadcaster of CBEF) Windsor (Ici Radio-Canada Première)*

== TV ==
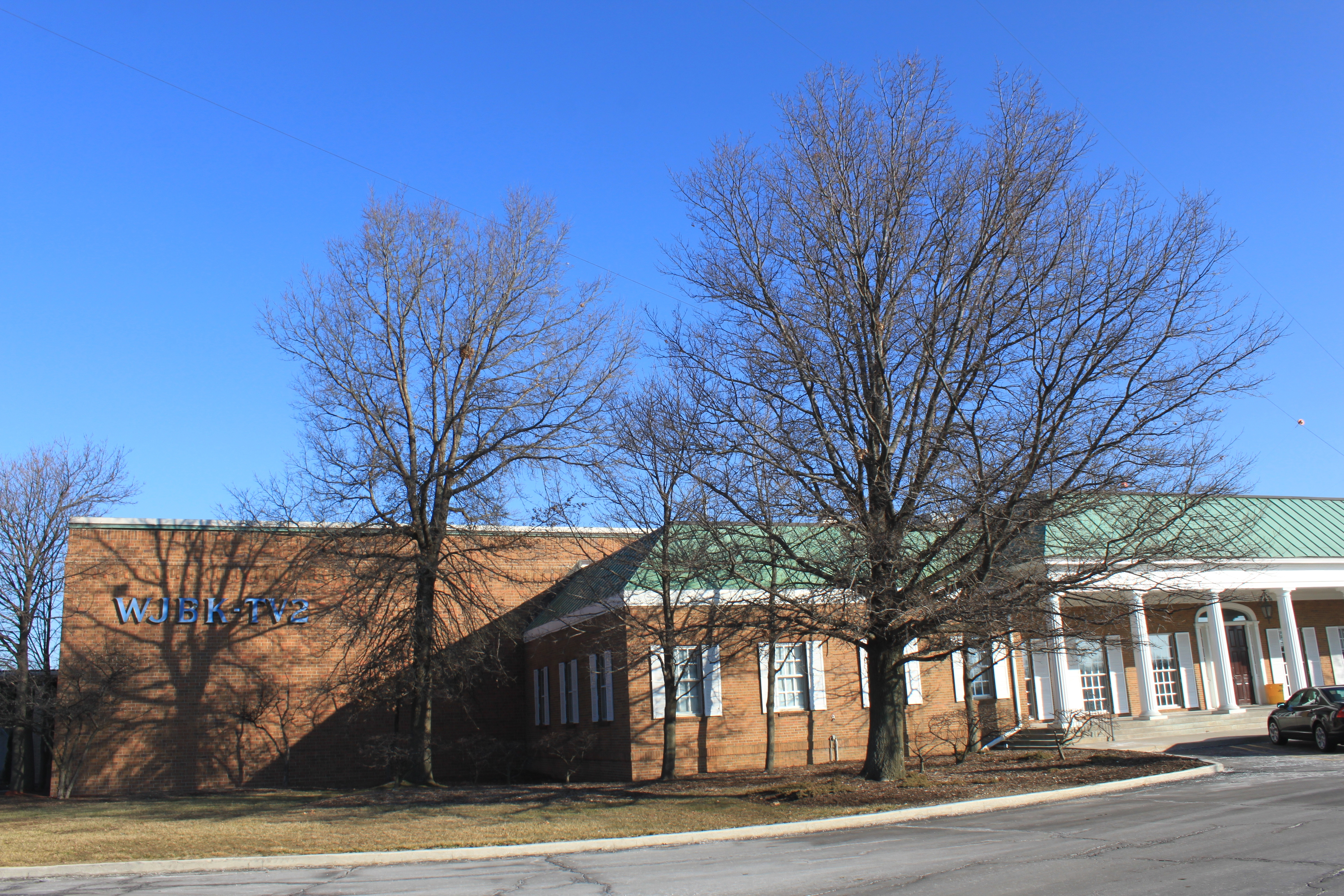
WJBK studios in Southfield, Michigan

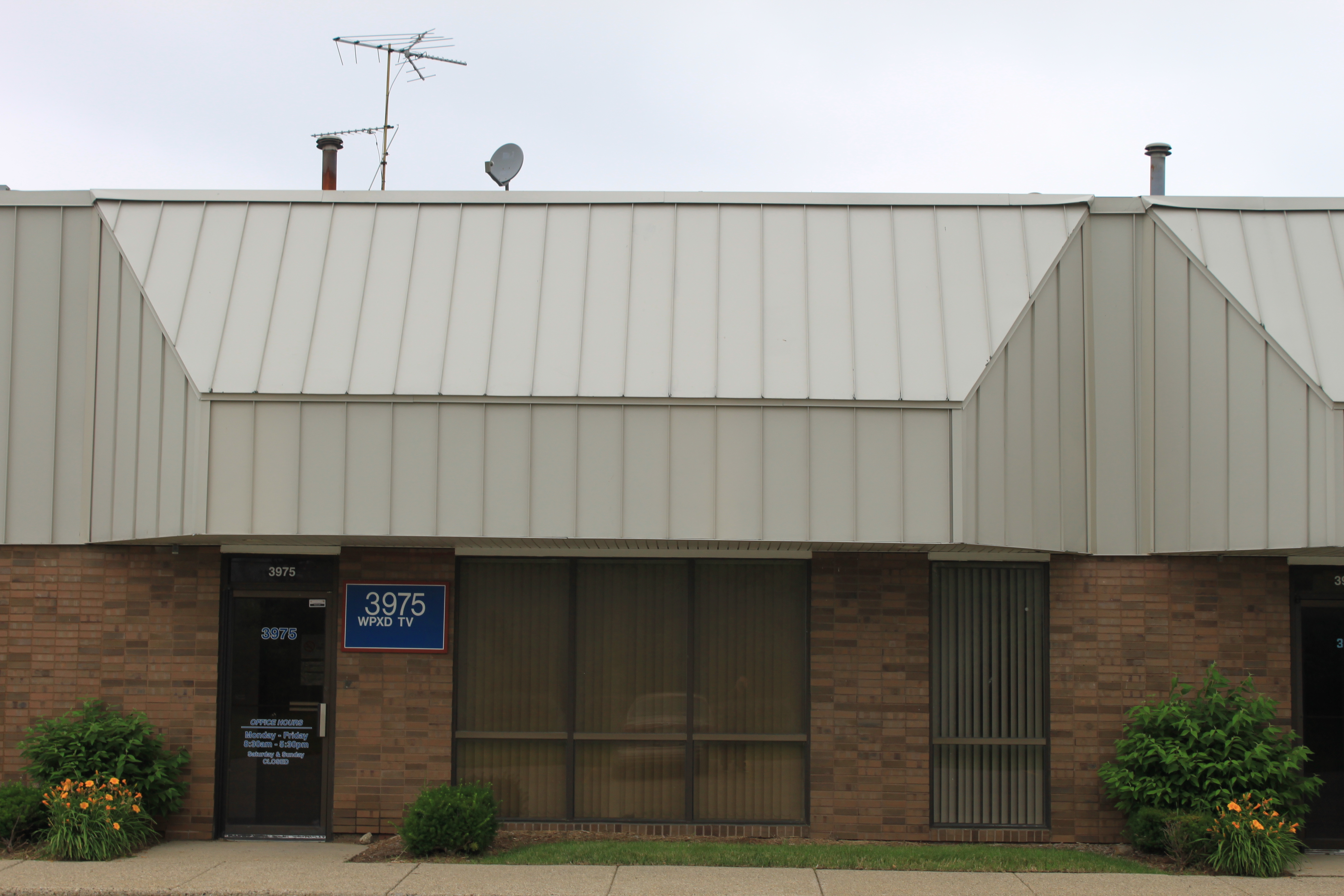
WPXD-TV offices in Ann Arbor, Michigan

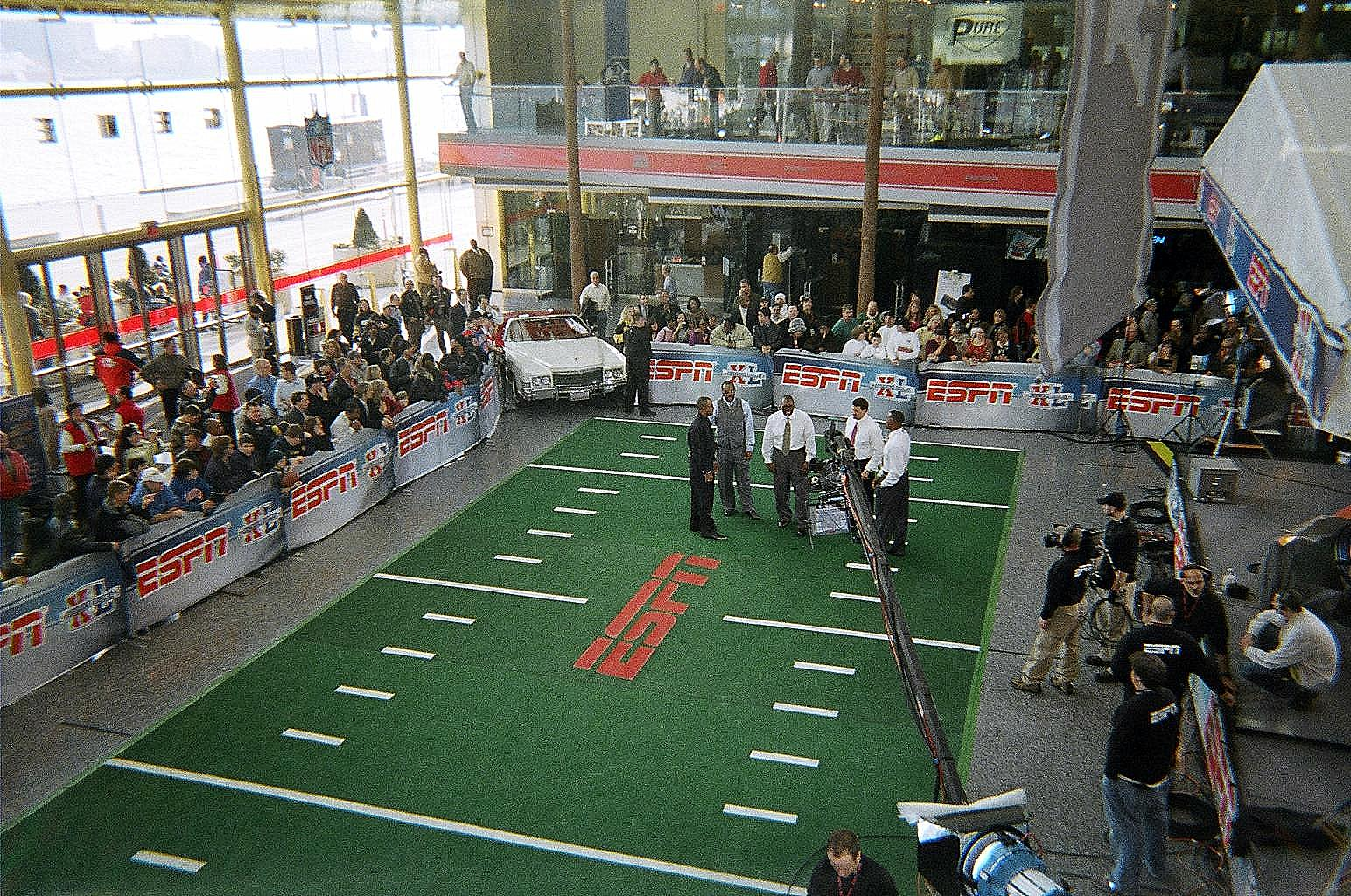
Wintergarden was turned into a makeshift studio for ESPN during their Super Bowl XL coverage.

The Detroit television market is the 14th largest in the United States, and it has additional viewers in Ontario, Canada (Windsor and its surrounding area on broadcast and cable). Detroit is home to owned-and-operated stations of CBS, Fox, and Daystar and two station duopolies owned by Paramount Skydance Corporation and the E.W. Scripps Company.

=== Full-power ===
- 2 WJBK Detroit (Fox)*
- 4 WDIV-TV Detroit (NBC)
- 7 WXYZ-TV Detroit (ABC)
- 20 WMYD Detroit (Independent)
- 31 WPXD-TV Ann Arbor (Ion Television)
- 38 WADL Mount Clemens (MyNetworkTV)
- 50 WKBD-TV Detroit (The CW)
- 56 WTVS Detroit (PBS)
- 62 WWJ-TV Detroit (CBS)*

=== Low-power ===
- 3 WHNE-LD Detroit (NewsNet)*
- 15 WHPS-CD Detroit (Independent/WHPR-FM/WVIE)
- 18 WDWO-CD Detroit (Vision Latina)
- 19 WUDL-LD Detroit (Infomercials)
- 23 WUDT-LD Detroit (Daystar)*
- 28 WLPC-CD Redford (The Impact Network)

(*) - indicates channel is a network owned-and-operated station.

=== Cable ===
- FanDuel Sports Network Detroit
- Michigan Channel

=== Canadian viewership ===
Most of Metro Detroit receives stations from adjacent Windsor, Ontario, most notably, CBC Television owned-and-operated station CBET-DT. Conversely, multiple television stations in Detroit enjoy Canadian viewership and consider the market as part of their primary audience.

== Internet ==
- The Detroit Cast
- Sports Radio Detroit

== Media corporations ==
- Adell Broadcasting Corporation
- Detroit Media Partnership
- The Word Network
- Graham Media Group

== See also ==
- List of people from Detroit
- List of films set in Detroit
- Media in Windsor, Ontario

== Bibliography ==
- Silas Farmer (1890). "(Newspapers)". History of Detroit and Wayne County and Early Michigan: a Chronological Cyclopedia (3rd ed.). Detroit. hdl:2027/mdp.39015071373867 – via HathiTrust.
