= Media in Windsor, Ontario =

Windsor, Ontario is the fourth-largest border city media market in Canada, after Toronto, Vancouver and Montreal. It is also the only one of those four markets to exist within the shadow of a larger American media market. While Toronto, Vancouver and Montreal are all the dominant media markets in their regions and are adjacent to significantly smaller American markets, Windsor is located directly across the border from Detroit, the 11th largest television market and ninth-largest radio market in the United States. Thus, it is considered part of the Detroit television and radio market for purposes of territorial programming rights. It can also receive radio and television signals from Toledo, Flint, Lansing and even Cleveland.

Since Windsor is considered part of one large American media market (Detroit) and close to two others (Cleveland and Toledo), the city's media outlets (radio and television stations, and newspaper) have a special status designated by the Canadian Radio-television and Telecommunications Commission, exempting them from many of the Canadian content ("CanCon") requirements that most other broadcasters in Canada are legally required to follow. These CanCon requirements, mandating that a minimum of 35% of the broadcast material of a station must be of Canadian artists, actors, or shows in/about Canada, have been blamed in part for the decline of the popular Windsor radio station, CKLW, a 50,000-watt AM radio station that in the late 1960s, prior to the advent of CanCon, had been the number one radio station not only in Detroit and Windsor, but also in the Toledo and Cleveland markets.

Windsor has also been exempt from the CRTC's concentration of media ownership rules. The CRTC formally established this exemption in 1993, when the commission allowed CHUM Limited to acquire the radio stations owned by competitor CUC Broadcasting. Blackburn Radio operates one station and has a rebroadcaster of its Chatham station in Windsor, but all other commercial broadcast outlets in the city are owned by Bell Media, which bought CHUM in 2006.

== Radio ==
In addition to Windsor's own radio stations, virtually all radio stations in the Detroit market are also available in the city, as well as some from Toledo.

Frequency	Call sign	Branding	Format	Owner	Notes
580 AM	CKWW	AM 580	Classic hits	Neeti P. Ray	
800 AM	CKLW	AM 800	News/talk	Bell Media Radio	
1550 AM	CBEF	Ici Radio-Canada Première	News/talk	Société Radio-Canada	French
88.7 FM	CIMX-FM	89X	Alternative Rock	Bell Media Radio	
89.9 FM	CBE-FM	CBC Music	Public music	Canadian Broadcasting Corporation	
90.5 FM	CJAH-FM	UCB Radio 90.5FM	Christian music	United Christian Broadcasters Canada (UCB)	
93.9 FM	CIDR-FM	Virgin Radio 93.9	Top 40 (CHR)	Bell Media Radio	
95.9 FM	CJWF-FM	Country 95-9	Country	Blackburn Radio	
96.7 FM	CHYR-FM	Mix 96.7	Hot AC	Blackburn Radio	Broadcasts from Leamington, Ontario
97.5 FM	CBEW-FM	CBC Radio One	News/talk	Canadian Broadcasting Corporation	
99.1 FM	CJAM-FM	CJAM 99.1	Campus radio	University of Windsor	formerly on 91.5 FM prior to October 7, 2009
100.7 FM	CKUE-FM-1	Cool FM	Classic hits	Blackburn Radio	rebroadcaster of a station from Chatham-Kent
102.3 FM	CINA-FM	102.3FM CINA Radio	Multilingual	Neeti P. Ray	
103.9 FM	CJBC-FM-2	Ici Musique	Public music	Canadian Broadcasting Corporation	French; rebroadcaster of CJBC-FM Toronto.
105.5 FM	CBEF-2-FM	Ici Radio-Canada Première	News/talk	Canadian Broadcasting Corporation	French; LP rebroadcaster of CBEF 1550.

== Television ==
Windsor is not directly served by Canada's major commercial networks. Any commercial stations operating in Windsor would be required to purchase program rights at Detroit market rates, which are higher than any market in Canada. Additionally, the commercial networks air a large amount of American programming, and would be forced to black most of it out in Windsor to protect the broadcast rights of the Detroit stations. The city is served only by the Canadian Broadcasting Corporation's English network and the provincially owned public broadcaster TVOntario, both of which air almost entirely Canadian-produced programming, and by the smaller CTV 2 system.

Both CTV and Global put only marginal signals into Windsor itself. The nearest CTV rebroadcaster is CKCO-DT's Sarnia-area repeater near Oil Springs, while the nearest Global transmitter is CIII-DT-22 between Leamington and Wheatley, near Point Pelee (though its city of license is Stevenson, northeast of Wheatley). CIII-DT-22 is highly directional, aimed towards Chatham-Kent to the northeast, and Leamington and Kingsville to the west, with a strong null towards Windsor and Detroit (however, it is still receivable with a strong rooftop antenna), presumably to protect the Detroit stations. Both CKCO and CIII are available on cable.

Even the CTV 2 station, CHWI-DT, is officially licensed to Wheatley rather than Windsor. While the station's studios and operations are based in Windsor, CHWI only has a low-power UHF repeater in downtown Windsor itself, which broadcasts from a directional antenna specifically designed to minimize the station's reception area in Michigan.

Channel	PSIP	Call sign	Network	Notes
9	9.1	CBET-DT	CBC	
16	16.1	CHWI-DT	CTV 2	Main CHWI-DT signal, Stevenson, Ontario
17	26.1	CHWI-DT-60	CTV 2	Windsor repeater of CHWI-DT
19	19.1	CICO-DT-32	TVOntario	Repeater of CICA-DT, Toronto
33	22.1	CIII-DT-22	Global	Repeater of CIII-DT, Toronto; broadcasts from Stevenson

Windsor was previously served by CBEFT, a local Radio-Canada outlet that later became a repeater of CBLFT in Toronto. The transmitter for this station shut down permanently on July 31, 2012, due to budget cuts affecting the CBC.

See also TV stations in the Detroit, Toledo, and Cleveland markets.

=== Out-of-market stations ===
In addition to the Detroit stations, Windsor and most of Essex County, Ontario also receive television stations from Toledo (WTOL, WTVG, WNWO-TV, WGTE-TV and WUPW), and the southern part of the county receives some of Cleveland's television stations (WKYC, WEWS-TV, WJW, WOIO, WVIZ, WUAB and WBNX-TV). Only WTOL, WTVG, and WNWO were carried on cable services, having been dropped in 2009 during the American DTV transition. In the past, however, WKYC, WEWS, and WJW were all carried on Trillium Cable (and later, Shaw Cable, its successor) in Kingsville and Leamington, and nearby parts of Southern Essex County until 2000, when Cogeco displaced Shaw as the cable provider for the region, and merged the Leamington and Windsor cable services back into one county-wide system.

Along with WKYC, WEWS, and WJW, WOIO and WUAB were frequently also listed in the TV Guides for Windsor and area, though all Toledo and Cleveland locals have since been "dropped" from the listings, with only WTOL, WTVG, and WUAB remaining listed. No Cleveland stations (in either analog or digital) push past Cottam, Ontario outside of tropospheric skip events, let alone reaching downtown Windsor, over the air (mainly due to adjacent channel interference from the Detroit channels), and Toledo stations barely make it over the air to downtown Windsor. Simultaneous substitution rules are generally in effect for cable and satellite audiences.

While not listed in TV guides, the northern edge of Essex County and most of Windsor were within reception range of Flint's WCMZ-TV (thanks to its transmitter's relatively close location in southern Genesee County, Michigan) prior to it going off the air on April 23, 2018, and the October 16, 2009 issue of The Windsor Star had stated readers in the Belle River area were able to add Flint's WJRT-TV to their lineups, albeit with very weak signal strength. In place of WCMZ-TV, the southern edge of Essex County, including Leamington, receives WUAB from Cleveland.

Bally Sports Detroit is not carried in Windsor, although games seen on the network can be viewed via out of market sports packages. Until the 2014-15 season, CBET also chose to prioritize Hockey Night in Canada regional games involving the Detroit Red Wings over the default game for Ontario (typically the Toronto Maple Leafs) if they were playing a Canadian team or were in a playoff series allotted to CBC. This no longer occurs, as HNIC now airs the same game nationally on all CBC stations. Toronto Blue Jays games on CBC were once blacked out in Windsor, but was later lifted (the CBC no longer carries Blue Jays games on the network).

Prior to the 2009 US analog television shutdown and digital conversion, in certain weather conditions, WILX-TV from Lansing, Michigan could also be seen, albeit weakly, in Windsor (along with CFPL-DT from London, both on VHF 10, WLMB-TV on UHF 40, now VHF 5 / PSIP 40.1, and CBLN UHF 40). Theoretically, Lansing's WLNS-TV could also be receivable to a degree, as its coverage area reaches the Detroit River. However, both analog channels were adjacent to CBET and WXYZ, respectively, which hindered reception. Since the switchover, WILX's digital signal (VHF 10) remained adjacent to CBET (VHF 9), though WLNS's digital signal moved from VHF 6 to UHF channel 36; however, reception of WLNS would become an issue again for a brief period when CBEFT relocated to UHF channel 35 after the Canadian switchover, the issue becoming moot after that station closed down in 2012.

As mentioned above, the city gets a marginal analogue signal from CKCO-TV-3 in Sarnia. It also gets very weak digital signals from CHCH-DT and CFMT-DT's London transmitters.

== Print ==
Windsor and its surrounding area has been served by the Windsor Star since 1888. The regional newspaper is the only daily in Windsor and Essex County and is owned by Postmedia Network. It has attracted the highest readership per capita in its circulation range of any Canadian metropolitan newspaper. Windsorite.ca is an online news publication, featuring up-to-date news stories, arts, culture, food and local event listings. Biz X Magazine is a business/lifestyle monthly print publication serving both Windsor and Detroit.

The city's francophone community is served by the weekly newspaper Le Rempart.

== Film ==
The 2000 film Borderline Normal, featuring Robin Dunne, Stephanie Zimbalist, Corbin Bernsen and Michael Ironside, is set in Windsor. Many exterior locations, such as Ouellette Avenue, Dieppe Park and the Ambassador Bridge were featured.

Several scenes in Michael Moore's 2002 film Bowling for Columbine were also filmed in Windsor. Moore later returned to Windsor to film scenes for his 2007 film Sicko.

Windsor was the setting of the television series Across the River to Motor City, a crime drama whose plot incorporated many aspects of Windsor's cross-border relationship with Detroit.

A number of scenes featuring Harrison Ford in the 1990 film Presumed Innocent were filmed in Windsor's Coventry Gardens. The house in the film is located on Riverside Dr. just east of the Hiram Walker Distillery. The scenes of the Renaissance Center in the film were shot from Windsor.

It is featured in the backdrop of Tony Scott's 1993 film True Romance. Windsor can clearly be seen in the background during the Christian Slater/Dennis Hopper trailer scene along the Detroit River.

The 2007 film Baby Blues was shot throughout Windsor.

The studio segments of the 2009 NBC and Global comedy series Howie Do It were taped at Caesars Windsor.

The 2013 film The Bird Men was shot almost entirely in Windsor utilizing Ojibway Park and Ojibway Nature Centre, as well as several house locations around the University of Windsor. The film production crew worked out of the now closed St. Anne's Highschool building in Tecumseh.

== Online ==
In addition to tradition media formats, Windsor is served by a number of online-only news publications.

OurWindsor.ca is an online publication owned by Metroland Media Group.

windsoriteDOTca News, is a locally owned, online news site covering news, arts and events. It was founded in 2010.

519 Magazine, is a local entertainment/arts publication, which launched in 2009 as a print publication, but became an online flipbook magazine and website with local reviews, photos and interviews in 2020.

In Play! Magazine is a regional sports and entertainment publication serving Windsor, Ontario, and the Detroit metropolitan area since 2008, covering local teams, high school sports, and major professional leagues.

== See also ==
- Media in Detroit
