= CBC Windsor =

CBC Windsor refers to:

- CBEW-FM, CBC Radio One on 97.5 FM
- CBE-FM, CBC Radio 2 on 89.9 FM
- CBET-DT, CBC Television on channel 9

SRC Windsor refers to:

- CBEF, Première Chaîne on 540 AM
- CJBC-FM-1, Espace Musique on 103.9 FM, rebroadcasts CJBC-FM
- CBEFT, Ici Radio-Canada Télé on channel 54, rebroadcasts CBLFT
