= Cina =

Cina, Cinà or CINA may refer to:

== People ==
- Chinas or Chīnaḥ (Sanskrit चीन (cīna)), a people mentioned in ancient Indian literature from the first millennium BC

=== Given name ===
- Cina Lawson (fl. 2010–present), Togolese politician and government minister
- Cina Munch (born 1971), Fijian swimmer
- Cina Soul, stage name of Ghanaian singer-songwriter Christie Quincyna Quarcoopome (born 1996)

=== Surname ===
- Brian Cina, American 21st century politician
- Federico Cinà (born 2007), Italian tennis player
- Frederick A. Cina (1908–1984), American lawyer and politician
- Jan Cina (born 1988), Czech artist dancer, actor and singer
- Michele Cinà (born 1956), Italian long-distance runner

== Media ==
- CINA Media Group, an owner of Canadian radio stations:
  - CINA (AM), based in Mississauga, Ontario, Canada
  - CINA-FM, based in Windsor, Ontario, Canada
  - CKIN-FM, also known as Radio CINA, based in Montreal, Quebec, Canada

== Other uses ==
- Former Buginese lost kingdom of Cina, later absorbed by Luwu
- China, also known as Cina, a country in East Asia
- Stenocereus alamosensis, also known as cina, a species of cactus native to Mexico
- Canadian Indigenous Nurses Association

== See also ==
- Kapitan Cina, a former high-ranking civil administration position in colonial Indonesia, Malaysia, Singapore, Borneo and the Philippines
- Artemisia cina, commonly known as santonica, Levant wormseed, and wormseed, an Asian species of herbaceous perennial in the daisy family
- Bukit China, a hillside of historical significance in the capital of Malaysian state of Malacca, Malacca Town
