= WERW =

WERW may refer to:

- WERW (FM), a radio station (94.3 FM) licensed to serve Monroe, Michigan, United States
- WERW (student radio), an unlicensed radio station at Syracuse University
