= CBEFT =

Television station in Ontario, Canada (1976–2012)

Defunct, used to be a semi-satellite of CBLFT-DT, Toronto
- Windsor, Ontario; Canada
- Channels: Analog: Formerly 35 (UHF)
- Branding: Radio-Canada Ontario

Programming
- Affiliations: Radio-Canada

Ownership
- Owner: Société Radio-Canada
- Sister stations: CBET-DT, CBEW-FM, CBE-FM, CBEF

History
- First air date: July 16, 1976
- Last air date: August 1, 2012
- Former channel numbers: 78 (1976–1982); 54 (1982–2011)
- Call sign meaning: CBC Essex Français Télévision

Technical information
- ERP: 36 kW
- HAAT: 206.8 m
- Transmitter coordinates: 42°9′12″N 82°57′11″W

Links
- Website: Radio-Canada Ontario

CBEFT was the Radio-Canada owned-and-operated television station serving Franco-Ontarians in Windsor, Ontario, Canada. Previously licensed as a standalone television station, it later operated as a semi-satellite of Toronto station CBLFT-DT. It broadcast an analogue signal on UHF channel 35 from a transmitter near Concession Road 12 in Essex.

Owned by the Société Radio-Canada arm of the Canadian Broadcasting Corporation, it was a sister to CBC Television outlet CBET-DT and operated master control facilities at that station's studios on Riverside Drive West and Crawford Avenue (near the Detroit River) in downtown Windsor.

On cable, CBEFT was seen on Cogeco Windsor channel 12. It was not seen on the Detroit-area systems, such as Comcast Detroit nor Bright House Livonia. The station broadcast at 144 kW with a directional antenna, relatively low for a full-powered analogue station on the UHF band. It could be picked up to some degree in the Detroit area, as far west as Washtenaw and Lenawee counties and as far south as Sandusky and Port Clinton, Ohio.

== History ==
=== CBEFT as originating station ===
CBEFT's logo as "U78", on Channel 78.

The station first aired on Channel 78 in 1976, making it Canada's second-highest-numbered UHF station following the launch of CITY-TV in 1972 on Channel 79. Originally, it was a full-time satellite of Radio-Canada flagship CBFT in Montreal.

CBEFT was the first non-English TV station to sign-on in the Detroit-Windsor market — it would be later joined by Spanish-language SIN affiliate W66BV (channel 19, now WUDL-LD) in 1983. During that period, and again from 2004 to 2009, the Detroit/Windsor market was the only market in the United States or Canada with terrestrial stations in both Spanish and French; the Spanish station during the latter period was Univision affiliate WUDT-CA on channel 23. After WUDT switched to the English-language Daystar Television Network in August 2009, CBEFT again became the sole terrestrial non-English station in the market.

CBEFT offered the full Radio-Canada line-up, except for some American series; this is because Windsor is reckoned as part of the Detroit market for the purposes of programming rights. Also, most Montreal Expos baseball games were not seen on CBEFT, as Windsor is part of Detroit Tigers territory.

CBEFT moved to channel 54 on September 29, 1982, when TV channels above 69 were removed from the TV spectrum.

=== CBEFT as rebroadcaster ===
From the mid-1980s at the earliest, it was a semi-satellite of CBLFT in Toronto as part of the Ontario-Outaouais network. In 1991, as part of cost-cutting measures at the CBC, CBEFT's licence, along with all other Radio-Canada transmitters in Ontario, was merged with that of CBOFT in Ottawa. However, CBEFT, along with CBLFT's other former repeaters, carried the split-feed newscast for the rest of Ontario that was produced at CBOFT.

On April 28, 2010, the CRTC relicensed CBLFT as a standalone station, which would again produce a separate newscast for the province of Ontario outside of CBOFT's primary market. At the same time, CBEFT was relicensed as a rebroadcaster of CBLFT. In recent years, CBEFT relayed CBLFT off a satellite link, which would get disrupted under severe weather conditions, which would cause its equipment to display an error message.

=== Demise ===
CBEFT was forced to move again to UHF 35 when channels 52–69 were removed from the television spectrum on August 31, 2011; the new channel was granted when other nearby stations that broadcast on channel 35 in analog - WDCQ-TV in Bad Axe, Michigan; WGVU-TV in Grand Rapids, Michigan; WSEE-TV in Erie, Pennsylvania; and WLIO in Lima, Ohio - moved to new digital frequencies. CBEFT occupied analogue UHF 35 for less than a year before going permanently dark, as by 2011, the CBC had made clear that it had no plans to convert any non-originating stations in mandatory transition markets to digital. On August 16, 2011, the CRTC granted a one-year temporary extension to continue operation of 22 repeaters in mandatory markets, including CBEFT, in analogue until August 31, 2012.

On July 31, 2012, CBC and Radio-Canada decommissioned their entire network of re-transmitters nationwide, shutting down all 620 analogue signals permanently as a cost-cutting measure. The network abandoned its over-the-air viewers in every market in which it did not operate broadcast studios, regardless of whether the markets were required to convert to digital television.

No CBC or Radio-Canada television re-transmitters were converted to digital. CBC did convert CBEFT's English language sister station CBET to digital, as it is an originating station.

On June 8, 2012, local Windsor NDP MPs Brian Masse and Joe Comartin asked CBC president Hubert Lacroix to reconsider shutting down CBEFT, recommending instead to install digital multiplexing equipment and carry CBEFT on a digital subchannel of sister station CBET-DT. This was also supported by Windsor City Council. CBC was not willing to implement digital subchannels to restore programming in Windsor or any other market in which one of the two languages was formerly provided by a re-broadcast transmitter. Current CRTC regulations permit subchannels, but require they be licensed separately.

On July 17, 2012, the CRTC approved the CBC's plans to close down all repeaters, including CBEFT, by August 1, 2012. Their licenses were revoked at CBC's request. As CBC retained valuable cable television slots in all communities which it had abandoned over-the-air, the network claims that only a minority of viewers have completely lost the signal.

Following CBEFT's closure on August 1, 2012, the corresponding cable slot on Cogeco and other area systems was assigned to CBLFT.
