= The New Dance Show =

US television program

- Genre: Electrofunk, funk, disco, Detroit techno, Chicago house
- Created by: R.J. Watkins
- Developed by: RJ Watkins Late Night Entertainment
- Ending theme: The New Dance Show Mix
- Country of origin: United States
- Original language: English

Production
- Production locations: Detroit, Michigan (1988–1994); Highland Park, Michigan (1994–1996)

Original release
- Network: WGPR-TV 62, Detroit (1988–1994); W68CH, Highland Park (1994–1996)
- Release: 1988 – 1996

Related
- The Scene

The New Dance Show is a television series in Detroit, Michigan, which ran on WGPR-TV 62 (now a CBS affiliate known as WWJ-TV) and W68CH 68 (now WHPS-CD 15). Hosted and executively produced by R.J. Watkins alongside producer Henry Tyler, they worked to capture the styles, hair, music, and culture of the late 1980s and early 1990s.

== History ==
The New Dance Show was developed as a spin-off of The Scene, which ran from October 1975 to December 1987. The Scene, was described as being more "disco-oriented" as it brought new wave of techno and electronic sound after the disco-era.

Watkins told Michigan Chronicles "'There was such a strong desire for a dance show..after it [The Scene] was gone for awhile they missed it".

The New Dance Show debuted in 1988, and the ratings were good from the start. The show was the first show recorded at Reggie's Moulin Rouge in Detroit and the first Black-owned radio and television broadcast show established in the country.

Production later moved to Highland Park in 1994 after R.J. Watkins' purchase of WHPR-FM. The New Dance Show briefly ended production shortly afterward after WGPR was sold and Watkins signed on his W68CH; a sister station to WHPR, which would resume production of The New Dance Show for two additional years. Reruns currently air on the now-WHPS-CD at various evening hours.

== Music, dancers, and style ==
Throughout the show music from several influential Detroit techno artists and outlets were featured. Many viewers of the show recall hearing artists such as Kraftwerk, Techno Bass, Risse, and more.

The New Dance Show was a local version of Soul Train and featured regular dancers. Many of the dancers on the show grew up watching Soul Train and The Scene, a foundation to them finding their own unique style. Some of the most popular dancers from the show include, Keith Bledsoe, LaWanda Gray, Norman Sadler and Pam Thomas. The dance styles ranged from Detroit street-style and free style with elements of disco.
