= WVIE =

WVIE may refer to:

- WVIE (FM), a radio station (107.3 FM) licensed to serve Charlotte Amalie, U.S. Virgin Islands
- WQLL, a radio station (1370 AM) licensed to serve Pikesville, Maryland, United States, which used the call sign WVIE from 2006 until 2012
- WNPX-LD, a low-power television station (channel 24) licensed to serve Nashville, Tennessee, United States, which used the call sign WVIE-LP from 1998 until 2003
