= CHAM (AM) =

Radio station in Hamilton, Ontario

- Hamilton, Ontario; Canada
- Broadcast area: Greater Toronto and Hamilton Area
- Frequency: 820 kHz (AM)
- Branding: Big AM 820

Programming
- Format: Multicultural (Punjabi music)

Ownership
- Owner: Neeti Prakash Ray (CINA Media Group)
- Sister stations: CKOC, CINA, CKFG-FM

History
- First air date: November 1959
- Former call signs: CHIQ (1959–1967); CHAM (1967–1976); CJJD (1976–1982)
- Former frequencies: 1280 kHz (1959–1985)
- Call sign meaning: "Hamilton"

Technical information
- Licensing authority: CRTC
- Class: B
- Power: 50,000 watts (day); 10,000 watts (night)
- Transmitter coordinates: 43.116111°N 79.776944°W

Links
- Webcast: CHAM webcast
- Website: bigam820.com

CHAM (820 kHz) is an AM radio station in Hamilton, Ontario. It is owned by Neeti Prakash Ray and is part of the CINA Media Group. The station is branded Big AM 820 CINA Radio Punjabi and plays contemporary South Asian music.

CHAM's 6-tower array is located near Binbrook.

== History ==
CHAM began operations in November 1959 as a 5,000-watt station on 1280 kHz with the CHIQ call sign. Initially the station broadcast a classical music format but rock and roll was featured later in the 1960s, with Canadian radio personality David Marsden among the station's DJ roster. In 1965, the power was increased to 10,000 watts day/5,000 watts night (the station went full-time 10 kW in 1968). The station was purchased from CHIQ, Ltd. in 1967 by (Ted) Rogers Broadcasting Ltd., which received approval from the CRTC to change the call letters to CHAM. Under Rogers' ownership and management by Dancy Broadcasting, Ltd., CHAM launched a "Middle of the road" music format on November 1, 1967.

By 1970, CHAM switched to Top 40 format, directly competing with CKOC (a future sister station of CHAM's in the 2000s) and including in its playlist many records that didn't receive exposure elsewhere in the market. Some of the personalities who worked at CHAM during this time period included Paul Godfrey, Dick Joseph (who worked there twice - the second time under their next call letters), Gil Harris, Rockin' Ron Baptist, Ravin' Dave Mitchell, Don Collins, Bob Wood (later program/operations manager of WBEN-AM-FM in Buffalo), Ike Isaac, Ken Packham, Skip Dewling, Wayne Dion, J.J.Clarke, Don West, Len Robinson, Dave Fisher Ted Michaels, and newscaster Glen Darling. CHAM published a weekly Top 30 poster approximately between 1971 and 1974. In an unusual move, CHAM's broadcasting facilities were located inside a shopping mall called Terminal Towers, from which passers by could peer into the station's glass walls and watch the announcers work.

=== CJJD ===
In 1976, CHAM was sold to Keith Dancy and the station adopted a "gold and great" format under the CJJD call sign. Soon afterward, the station's facilities were moved out of Terminal Towers (and the public eye) and up a few blocks to Lloyd D. Jackson Square. For one year in 1978, the station held the radio broadcast rights to the Hamilton Tiger-Cats football team; between the team's creation in 1950 and 2014, it was the only year in which the Tiger-Cats were not heard on longtime broadcaster CHML (Tiger-Cats broadcasts, along with all other sports broadcasts in Hamilton, were acquired by TSN Radio 1150 in 2015).

=== Back to CHAM ===
In 1981, Moffat Communications, Ltd. acquired CJJD and immediately upgraded the station's facilities, expanded its news staff, and included some talk programming in the lineup. Moffat changed the station call sign back to CHAM in 1982, and in July 1983, changed format to country, broadcasting in AM stereo. On August 18, 1985, CHAM moved to 820 kHz, increasing power to 50,000 watts daytime and 10,000 watts at night.

As a pioneering country station, 820 CHAM would earn its greatest fame and following, having had a good run for 2+ decades under various management and ownership, including Golden West Broadcasting (who acquired the station in 1993), Affinity Radio Group (1997), and Telemedia (2000). CHAM was honoured as Canadian Country Music Association Station of the Year in 1989, the same year the Country Music Association bestowed Medium Market Station honours.

In 2002, Standard Broadcasting acquired CHAM and its sister stations (CKOC and CKLH), and on January 31, 2005, at 8:20a.m., with contemporary country listeners having gravitated to the FM dial, adjusted CHAM's format to become "The Legend", with the station concentrating on classic country music, with limited currents.

=== Talk radio ===
In October 2007, Astral Media acquired Standard Broadcasting's terrestrial radio and television assets, including CHAM. On August 29, 2008, the station began stunting with all-Christmas music, teasing listeners that on September 2, 2008, there would be "10,000 reasons to tune in at 8:20a.m." On September 2, CHAM's new format was revealed — a news/talk radio format as Talk 820. CHAM's talk schedule would include local talk shows hosted by Mike Nabuurs, Becky Coles, Jason Farr, Jodi Gaskell, Dave Shuttleworth, and Mike Bullard, along with syndicated shows including Dennis Miller. The new CHAM format included live sports coverage, including Hamilton Bulldogs hockey, Toronto Blue Jays baseball, and National Football League broadcasts from Westwood One.

The "Talk" format of CHAM did not provide the total numbers that Astral was looking for, with the station lagging behind longtime Hamilton talk stalwart CHML. Seeing an opportunity to fill a country void in the Hamilton market left by CING-FM's changeover to classic hits in 2009, and taking advantage of a staff restructuring at the Astral Hamilton station cluster, CHAM reverted to an all-country format (and the "820 CHAM" branding) on July 22, 2010 at Noon. The playlist concentrated on a range of music from 1990 to the present day, with larger focus on Canadian artists. The station would keep many of the sports commitments it adopted during its talk format, many of which it had already held prior to the talk format's debut.

=== Flip to comedy ===
By August 2011, CHAM gained country competition when CHKX-FM flipped formats from smooth jazz to country. CHKX and its clearer-sounding FM signal would eventually surpass CHAM in the ratings, leading to speculation that CHAM would drop country a second time. On August 20, 2012, Astral Media would confirm that CHAM would change to an all-comedy format; at 8:20 a.m. the next day (August 21, 2012), after playing "Here Comes Goodbye" by Rascal Flatts and "Sideways" by Dierks Bentley, the station became Funny 820, Astral's second full-time comedy station (after London's CKSL). The content on "Funny" relies heavily on vintage and archived stand-up and improvisational comedy bits provided by 24/7 Comedy Radio, a US-based service to which Astral owns exclusive Canadian broadcast rights. Local content is currently limited to voiceovers and traffic and entertainment updates provided by Mike Nabuurs, the "Funny 820 Ambassador of Funny" and the only on-air talent carried over from "820 CHAM", although spotlights on local comedy talent have not been ruled out in the future.

In early 2013, the station added Astral's new late night Humble & Fred show. Most recently, for the 2013-2014 hockey season, the station is airing Toronto Maple Leafs games in addition to their usual comedic fare.

24/7 Comedy ceased terrestrial distribution in August 2014. The station continued to broadcast of blocks of stand-up comedy bits and comedic talk shows since the closure, and was one of only two remaining stations in Canada to carry the format. It remained the second-least-listened-to station in the market, with, in the latest report from Numeris in fall 2018, 15,400 listeners (a 0.7% market share), ahead of only TSN Radio 1150.

On June 14, 2023, as part of a mass corporate restructuring at Bell Media, the company shut down six of their AM radio stations nationwide, and announced their intention to sell three others, including CHAM and sibling station CKOC.

=== Sale to CINA Radio Group ===
On November 16, 2023, the Canadian Radio-television and Telecommunications Commission announced that CHAM has been purchased from Bell Media by Neeti P. Ray, founder and CEO of the CINA Radio Group, which owns and operates numerous Canadian radio stations including CKFG-FM in Toronto, CINA in Mississauga, CKIN-FM in Montreal and CINA-FM in Windsor. The acquisition is part of a larger deal that includes the purchase of Bell's other Hamilton radio station CKOC and Windsor station CKWW for $455,000. The application was approved on June 26, 2024.

In late August 2024, the station began stunting and rebranded itself as Big AM 820 CINA Radio Punjabi, playing contemporary South Asian music.

== Logos ==
2005-2008
2008–2010
2010–2012

2012–2024
