= WHPS-CD =

Television station in Detroit

- Detroit, Michigan; United States
- Channels: Digital: 15 (UHF); Virtual: 15
- Branding: WHPS Detroit Live

Programming
- Affiliations: see § Subchannels

Ownership
- Owner: HME Equity Fund II, LLC

History
- Founded: August 31, 1990
- First air date: 1995
- Former call signs: W68CH (1990–2001); W33BY (2001–2015); W33BY-D (2015–2018)
- Former channel numbers: Analog: 68 (UHF, 1990–2003), 33 (UHF, 2001–2014); Digital: 33 (UHF, 2014–2019)
- Former affiliations: MTV2; American Independent Network; UATV (1990–2000); Launch TV (2000s–2010s)
- Call sign meaning: We're Highland Park's Station

Technical information
- Licensing authority: FCC
- Facility ID: 25722
- Class: CD
- ERP: 15 kW
- HAAT: 124.4 m (408 ft)
- Transmitter coordinates: 42°24′22″N 83°6′44″W

Links
- Public license information: Public file; LMS

WHPS-CD (channel 15) is a low-power, Class A television station in Detroit, Michigan, United States, owned by HME Equity Fund II. The station broadcasts from its studios at the corner of Victor and Brush Streets (near the intersection of Woodward Avenue and the Davison Freeway) in Highland Park, with its transmitter located near Burt Road and Capitol Avenue in the Weatherby section of Detroit, shared with radio stations WMUZ-FM and WCHB.

WHPS-CD is available nationwide through online streaming and on Roku and Xfinity channel 91 in Highland Park, Hamtramck, and most of Detroit (except for the southern portion of the Detroit neighborhood of Boynton).

Until December 4, 2014, the then-W33BY was also the only remaining American station in the Metro Detroit area to still broadcast only in analog. On April 23, 2014, the station had announced that LocusPoint Networks was beginning procedures to purchase it, making it a sister station to WDWO-CD (channel 18) and potential sister to WUDT-LD (channel 23), if that station is allowed to be sold from Daystar to LocusPoint. The sale closed successfully.

== Background ==
WHPS-CD was the Detroit area's first Black-owned TV station since WGPR (channel 62, now WWJ-TV) became a CBS affiliate. The station was owned until 2015 by R. J. Watkins, who, between 1988 and 1996, hosted and produced a dance program for WGPR-TV, The New Dance Show, which moved to WHPS-CD in 1995, and reruns still air on the station at various evening timeslots.

The station's television airtime is occupied mostly by phone-in talk shows (most are radio simulcasts), fashion shows, televangelism, paid advertisements, and a children's show called K.E.Y.S. Kids, which encourages kids to "Enjoy Yourselves Without Drugs".

WHPS-CD, WHPR-FM, and WVIE, a U.S. Virgin Islands radio station owned by Watkins, are also streamed online via their website. WHPS-CD is also on Roku. WVIE-FM has been simulcast on 33.3 since November 7, 2015. And WHPR-FM has been simulcast on 33.2 since November 8, 2015. In December 2015, the simulcast of 33.1 on 33.4 was replaced with The Dream Network.

== History ==
The station started out as W68CH on channel 68 in early 1995, and branded itself as "TNVC-Channel 68" and later "UHF 68, Highland Park". The station "moved" to W33BY in November 2001, but the station still operated on both channels. This continued until August 2002, when 33 and 68 carried separate schedules. Channel 68 would close down for good in September 2003. However, as of July 2006, TVguide.com still shows the station as on the air, carrying a schedule separate from W33BY. As of current, however, the FCC database has no listings for W68CH, or any channel 68, in the Detroit area. Viewers in the area have confirmed that channel 68 is no longer broadcasting, and has not for quite some time.

They later filed a construction permit to flash cut channel 33 to a digital signal, broadcasting at 4 kW from facilities at its studios in Highland Park. The permit was to expire September 1, 2015, the date on which all low-powered television stations in the United States must convert to digital or close down, as per the FCC's digital conversion plan. The station converted to digital operations on December 4, 2014, and was licensed by the FCC for digital operation on January 29, 2015.

When W33BY converted to digital, it was given a total of four subchannels. 33.1 was broadcast in 720p, with the other 3 subchannels being 480i simulcasts with a 4:3 aspect ratio. However, on November 7, 2015, a simulcast of WVIE with a slide saying "W33BY DETROIT" was added to 33.3. On November 8, 2015, WHPR-FM was added to 33.2, and The Dream Network was added to 33.4. 33.4, however, reverted to a simulcast of 33.1 again in May 2016. On August 3, 2018, the station changed its call letters to WHPS-CD.

== Subchannels ==
The station's signal is multiplexed:

Subchannels of WHPS-CD
Subchannel	Res.	Short name	Programming
15.1	1080i	WHPSCD-	Mariavision
15.2	480i	HlyFld	WHPS Detroit Live / Quinnly TV
15.3	480i	ShopLC	Shop LC
15.4	480i	Retro	Retro TV
15.5	480i	Hland	Heartland
15.6	480i	JTV	Jewelry TV

As part of the FCC's incentive auction, W33BY-D moved to UHF 15 as WHPS-CD (initially proposed as W15EC-D).

== See also ==
- WHPR-FM
- WVIE-FM
- Media in Detroit
