= WNZK =

- Dearborn Heights, Michigan; United States
- Broadcast area: Detroit metropolitan area
- Frequencies: 690 kHz (day); 680 kHz (night)
- Branding: Station of the Nations

Programming
- Format: Brokered programming

Ownership
- Owner: Birach Broadcasting Corporation

History
- First air date: October 12, 1985

Technical information
- Licensing authority: FCC
- Facility ID: 5348
- Class: B
- Power: 2,500 watts
- Transmitter coordinates: 42°5′55″N 83°19′48″W
- Translator: 93.5 W228CJ (Detroit)

Links
- Public license information: Public file; LMS
- Webcast: Listen live
- Website: birach.com

WNZK (690 and 680 AM) is a commercial radio station licensed to serve Dearborn Heights, Michigan, owned by the Birach Broadcasting Corporation. The station, branded as the "Station of the Nations" airs a brokered programming format, where program hosts pay for their time, and may advertise their clients' goods and services during their shows. It broadcasts in a variety of languages, including Arabic and several from Eastern Europe.

WNZK is unusual in that it broadcasts on two different frequencies: at 690 AM during the day, and at 680 AM at night. The station's transmitter is sited off Will Carleton Road in Huron Charter Township, Michigan.

On June 5, 2026, it was announced that Birach Broadcasting was purchasing a translator from Beasley Media group, 93.5 FM W228CJ, for $450,000. It would give WNZK coverage on the FM band for the first time and be the company's first FM signal within the Detroit radio market.

== History ==
WNZK began broadcasting on October 12, 1985. The western Detroit suburb of Westland was its original city of license. It switched to Dearborn Heights by 1990. The station was always owned by Birach Broadcasting. Its original studios were at 21700 Northwestern Highway in Southfield, Michigan.

According to the FCC online database, WNZK is the only AM radio station in North America using two frequencies, one by day, one at night.

== See also ==
- Media in Detroit
