= WJKL (FM) =

K-Love radio station in San Juan, Puerto Rico

San Juan, Puerto Rico; Puerto Rico
- Broadcast area: Puerto Rico
- Frequency: 105.7 MHz
- Branding: K-LOVE

Programming
- Language: English
- Format: Contemporary Christian
- Network: K-Love

Ownership
- Owner: Educational Media Foundation
- Sister stations: WVIE

History
- First air date: June 5, 1962; 63 years ago
- Former call signs: WOLA (1962–1966); WRFV-FM (1966–1968); WKVM-FM (1968–1971); WCAD-FM (1971–1976); WKVM-FM (1976–1982); WCAD (1982–2020)
- Former names: Alfa Rock
- Call sign meaning: "San Juan K-Love"

Technical information
- Licensing authority: FCC
- Facility ID: 3537
- Class: B
- ERP: 50,000 watts
- HAAT: 825.0 meters (2,706.7 ft)
- Transmitter coordinates: 18°16′54″N 66°56′46″W

Links
- Public license information: Public file; LMS
- Webcast: Listen Live
- Website: www.klove.com

WJKL (105.7 MHz), branded on-air as K-LOVE, is a non-commercial FM radio station licensed to San Juan, Puerto Rico. The station serves the island of Puerto Rico. The station is currently owned by Educational Media Foundation and carries network programming from K-LOVE, EMF's main Contemporary Christian music network.

== History ==
WJKL signed on in June 1968 as WKVM-FM. On July 25, 1978, WKVM-FM changed formats to rock as "Alfa Rock", the first FM with the format in Puerto Rico. The station was originally owned by American Colonial Broadcasting (a subsidiary of Pérez Perry Enterprises), which later was sold to Broadcasting & Programming Systems of Puerto Rico. In 1982, the station changed its call sign to WCAD.

=== Sale to Educational Media Foundation ===
On July 24, 2017, it was announced that the Educational Media Foundation was buying WCAD and its booster signals for $2.9 million. The station would be EMF's first located in a U.S. territory and would switch to the company's K-Love network. On September 20, 2017, WCAD went off the air due to the threat of Hurricane Maria across the island of Puerto Rico and the sale of the station to EMF was approved by the FCC, awaiting the consummation and would convert to a non-commercial educational radio station.

On March 3, 2018 at 12:06 a.m, Alfa Rock ended broadcasting after nearly 40 years as an album-oriented rock station. The final song on Alfa Rock was "The Perfectionist" by Saga. The station went silent on that day; and the sale of WCAD was completed on July 16, 2018.

In 2017, the station's transmitter site had been heavily damaged by Hurricane Maria. The station returned to the air on December 21, 2018, after ten months off the air and the completion of transmitter repairs.

After Alfa Rock ended broadcasting on March 3, 2018, some of the Alfa Rock programming and team members DJs Pedro Dávila, Jose Sanz and Fred Virella moved to an online radio station, AZ Rock. The station also airs an album-oriented rock format.

On May 14, 2020, WCAD changed its call letters to WJKL.
