= CKOC =

Radio station in Hamilton, Ontario

Coordinates: 43°03′04″N 79°48′41″W

- Hamilton, Ontario; Canada
- Broadcast area: Greater Toronto and Hamilton Area
- Frequency: 1150 kHz
- Branding: 1150 CKOC

Programming
- Format: Classic hits
- Affiliations: CHCH-DT

Ownership
- Owner: Neeti Prakash Ray (CINA Media Group)
- Sister stations: CHAM

History
- First air date: May 1, 1922
- Former call signs: CKMO (1992–1993)
- Former frequencies: 410 metres (1922–1925); 880 kHz (1925–1930); 1120 kHz (1930–1931); 630 kHz (1931–1933); 1120 kHz (1933–1941)
- Call sign meaning: Ontario Cycle (Original Owner’s Parent Company)

Technical information
- Class: B
- Power: 50,000 watts day 20,000 watts night

Links
- Website: 1150ckoc.com

CKOC (1150 kHz) is a commercial AM radio station in Hamilton, Ontario. It is owned by Neeti Prakash Ray and is part of the CINA Media Group. CKOC is a 50,000-watt, Class B station operating on a regional (not clear-channel) broadcast frequency, with transmitters located near Empire Corners in Haldimand County, about 25 kilometers (15 miles) south of Hamilton. A six-tower directional antenna is used at all times. The station has a classic hits format promoted as "Superhits of the 70s and 80s".

== History ==
=== Early history ===
CKOC has the distinction of being the oldest continuously operating radio station in Canada, on the air since May 1, 1922. Station CHAB, in Moose Jaw, Saskatchewan, began broadcasting a week earlier, on April 23, 1922, and is still on the air today, but was shut down for a period of time in 1933 before re-opening. As well, CFCF, later CINW, Montreal, had traced its sign on to 1919, but ceased operations in 2010.

In 1923, Ivan Miller broadcast on CKOC the first play-by-play report on a golf tournament in Canada, by using a system of flag semaphore from boy scouts at each hole. (Note: Information on the golf broadcast is compiled from these quoted sources: "Miller employed a flag system of communication with local boy scouts to provide play-by-play of the first golf broadcast by CKOC in 1923".; "From the rolling hills of Ancaster, Miller gave the first play-by-play report on a golf tournament in Canada, using a flag system by local boy scouts".; "Miller broadcast play-by-play of a golf tournament by using flag semaphore from boy scouts at each hole".) In the same year, he began broadcasting ice hockey games on CKOC from the Barton Street Arena.

Originally, CKOC's station was based in the Lower City at the corner of King William and John Streets, and was an offshoot of the Wentworth Radio and Supply Company. In the spring of 1922, the station became the third radio station in all of Canada. Other broadcast locations over the years for CKOC include, the 11th floor of the Royal Connaught Hotel in the downtown core, the Lister Block building on James & King Williams Streets, and a studio on Garfield Avenue near King & Sherman Avenue North in a building that once housed the Garfield exchange switching equipment of the Bell Telephone Company. During its early years, the station broadcast on a number of frequencies, including 880, 630 and 1120 kHz; the station moved to its current frequency of 1150 in 1941.

CKOC became a CBC affiliate in 1936 and would be an affiliate of the CBC's Trans-Canada Network until 1962.

=== Later history: CHR and Oldies formats ===
CKOC featured a contemporary hit radio format from 1960 to 1992, and increased its power to 50,000 watts in 1979. In August 1983, CKOC began broadcasting in AM stereo using the Motorola C-QUAM system.

On February 17, 1992, at noon, after a countdown of the Top 500 hits of all time (a long-running annual tradition at the station), and CKOC stopped broadcasting in AM stereo, CKOC debuted "Oldies 1150" with the new calls CKMO ("More Oldies"). However, on April 2, 1993, the station reverted to the heritage CKOC calls, admitting that dropping the calls in the first place had been a mistake and that the station's listeners wanted the original calls back. The station mentioned its Top 40 heritage on the air as part of the current oldies format, with liners such as, "The station that played 'em then... plays 'em again". The "Good Times, Great Oldies" branding started sometime in late 2006.

From 1928 to 1955, the call letters CKMO were used at a pioneer radio station in Vancouver. From 1993 to 2012, the CKMO call sign was again used at a radio station in Victoria, British Columbia. In 2014, the CKMO call letters moved to a radio station in Orangeville as CKMO-FM.

CKOC first applied for an FM station in 1968, but the FM station did not take to the air until 1986, as adult contemporary station CKLH-FM.

CKOC has suffered from much co-channel interference from CJRC in Gatineau, Quebec at night, particularly in Southwestern Ontario and north of Toronto which received a relatively clear signal for CKOC during the day. In these areas, CKOC was almost impossible to pick up on some nights due to CJRC. This interference was remedied in Spring 2007, when CJRC moved to the FM dial and closed the AM signal.

On October 28, 2007, CKOC was purchased by Astral Media as part of its purchase of Standard Broadcasting.

Logo under classic hits format, 2013-15

In 2012, CKOC, known as one of "Canada's Oldest radio stations", turned 90 years old.

In mid-June 2013, after CING-FM switched formats from Classic Hits to hot AC, CKOC added more 1970s' and 1980s' music to its playlist. It was the first time since February 1992, when the station changed its format, that any music later than the 1970s has been played on the station, a trend mirroring most other oldies outlets in North America, which have moved away from the oldies positioning and have adopted classic hits approaches. The station dropped the "Great Oldies" reference and referred to itself as "Classic Hits 1150 CKOC".

On June 27, 2013, Astral Media was absorbed by Bell Media, making CKOC a Bell owned-and-operated station.

On November 4, 2014, the CRTC approved an application by Bell Media to modify CKOC's facilities from a five-tower day pattern and a ten-tower night pattern with a transmitter power of 50,000 watts to a six-tower operation with a daytime transmitter power of 50,000 watts and a night-time transmitter power of 20,000 watts.

=== TSN Radio 1150 ===
Logo as TSN Radio 1150

On May 28, 2015, Bell Media announced that CKOC would flip to sports talk later that fall, joining the TSN Radio network as TSN Radio 1150. As part of a new agreement, the station became the home station for the CFL's Hamilton Tiger-Cats, and the Hamilton affiliate for the Toronto Raptors and Toronto Maple Leafs; the station also later acquired the rights to McMaster Marauders football. This move also made the station Hamilton's first-ever all-sports station. On September 2, CKOC announced they would flip to the format on Labour Day, September 7, in conjunction with the Tiger-Cats vs. Argonauts Labour Day Classic. CKOC ended its classic hits format with The Last Big 500 Countdown of the top classic hits during the Labour Day weekend before the launch of the sports format at 10 a.m. on September 7. The #1 song in the countdown, and the last song played on CKOC, was "Satisfaction" by The Rolling Stones.

The station carried three local programs, Ticats at Noon, Game Day and Tatti & Marsh. The rest of its programming was filled by simulcasts from sister station CHUM, and Fox Sports Radio. Initial ratings for TSN Radio in Hamilton were extremely poor, as CKOC's market share dropped from 2.9% to 0.3%. With approximately 5,900 listeners a week, CKOC is now the lowest-rated station in the Hamilton market.

In 2016, CKOC acquired rights to Hamilton Bulldogs hockey. On April 3, 2018, CKOC began broadcasting Sunday Night's Main Event, a professional wrestling talk show hosted by Jason Agnew (former host of the similar program Live Audio Wrestling).

=== BNN Bloomberg Radio ===
Logo as Bloomberg Radio 1150

On February 9, 2021, Bell Media ended the TSN Radio formats at CKOC, CFRW in Winnipeg and CKST in Vancouver. CKOC then flipped to BNN Bloomberg Radio, a business news format featuring programming from Bloomberg Radio and Bell Media's BNN Bloomberg television channel. The format originated from CFTE in Vancouver. Subsequently, the Tiger-Cats announced that they would pursue a new radio home.

=== Sale to CINA Media Group, return to classic hits ===
On June 14, 2023, as part of a mass corporate restructuring at Bell Media, the company shut down six of their AM radio stations nationwide, and announced their intention to sell three others, including CKOC and CHAM. In November 2023, Neeti P. Ray filed an application with the CRTC to acquire CKOC, CHAM, and Bell's Windsor AM station CKWW, for $445,000. Ray's applications stated he intended to continue operating the stations under the same terms and conditions as the existing licences. The applications were approved on June 26, 2024.

On August 19, 2024, CKOC was relaunched by the new ownership, reviving its previous classic hits format with a focus on music from the 1970s and 1980s. Former CKDX-FM host Kent Chambers became the station's morning host, while former CJXY-FM host Scott Penfold became its afternoon host. As of March 2026, the station has no on air personalities after Chambers announced he was let go at the end of February 2026.

In December 2025, the station announced a partnership with CHCH-DT to carry an audio simulcast of its evening news.
