= Sports Radio Detroit =

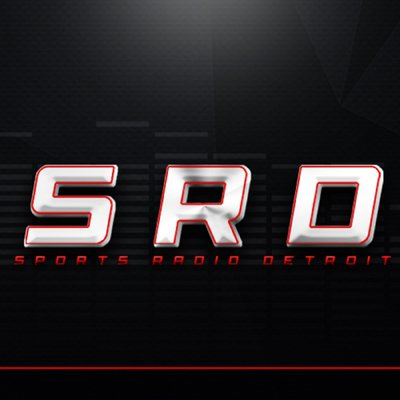
- United States
- Broadcast area: Worldwide
- Frequencies: Streaming Radio & Podcast
- Branding: SRD/Sports Radio Detroit

Programming
- Format: Sports Talk

Ownership
- Owner: SRD Productions, LLC (formerly)

History
- Founded: Mike Morland
- First air date: September 25, 2012
- Last air date: December 26, 2021
- Former call signs: letsgowingsmedia.com (2011) letsgowingsradio.com (2012)

Links
- Webcast: Listen Live
- Website: sportsradiodetroit.com

Sports Radio Detroit (SRD) was a Detroit-based internet sports broadcasting and news network covering Detroit's professional sports teams Detroit Lions, Detroit Tigers, Detroit Pistons and Detroit Red Wings, in addition to college and high school sports across Michigan from 2011-2021.

== History ==
=== Early history ===
Sports Radio Detroit was born out of the independent podcast series, The Red Line in collaboration with the unofficial Detroit Red Wings site, letsgowings.com. The show debuted on the independent website, letsgowingsmedia.com on October 31, 2011. The podcast shifted to a permanent home at letsgowingsradio.com in September 2012. It was here that the site continued to flourish during the summer of 2012 and into the NHL lockout in the fall of 2012.

=== Launch of sportsradiodetroit.com ===
With the possibility of a long-term NHL lockout looming over the 2012-2013 season, The Red Line podcast series and LetsGoWingsRadio.com anticipated a decline in content production. Given the strong Detroit sports market and limited local sports radio options, both The Red Line and LetsGoWingsRadio.com were dissolved in favor of a new venture: SportsRadioDetroit.com. This platform was founded by Mike Morland, host and creator of The Red Line and LetsGoWingsRadio.com.

Launched officially in the fall of 2012, the new website debuted with four independent online sports talk shows covering the Detroit Lions, Tigers, Pistons, and Red Wings. In the summer of 2013, Sports Radio Detroit (SRD) expanded its coverage to include soccer, reflecting its commitment to a broader audience. With its growing roster of media personalities and the backdrop of the 2012 NHL lockout, SportsRadioDetroit.com quickly established itself as a comprehensive hub for Detroit sports fans.SportsRadioDetroit.com aired its first original broadcast on January 18, 2013 with the first episode of Red Wings SRD. The first live show on occurred on April 25, 2013. Beginning in 2017, the site began covering high school and college sports.

On November 17, 2013, Sports Radio Detroit launched an updated website and introduced its new logo and brand, "SRD" - an update from the previous "Sports Radio Detroit" logo.

In an effort to better connect Detroit sports fans with their favorite athletes and columnists, SRD launched with a variety of interviews, including then Detroit City FC star and former MLS player, Knox Cameron, NFL Linebacker Chris Wilson, Detroit Lions Ndamukong Suh, Windsor Star sports columnist Bob Duff, Hockey Hall of Famer Larry Murphy, Detroit Red Wings center Riley Sheahan and Red Wings prospect Anthony Mantha.

=== Induction to Detroit Sports Media Association ===
Sports Radio Detroit became a member of Detroit Sports Media Association (formerly the Detroit Sports Broadcasters Association) in 2017. On December 7, 2019, Roger Castillo of SRD was announced as a board member of the organization.

=== Website ceases operation and current use of SRD branding ===
On December 26, 2021, after nearly a decade of operation, it was announced on Twitter that the Sports Radio Detroit website would cease operation and that some of the shows would continue on in various formats. Beginning in 2022, SRD's social media accounts began operating in affiliation with the Detroit Sports Podcast.

== Contests ==
=== Detroit March Madness ===
Beginning March 16, 2014, Sports Radio Detroit launched the first annual "Favorite Detroit Female Media Personality" contest. The public bracket-style contest highlighted 32 of Detroit's best based on media presence, quality of work and likability. After five rounds of voting, including 13,236 votes in 22 days, Amy Andrews of Fox 2 Detroit was named the 2014 Favorite Detroit Female Media Personality Award recipient. Fox 2 Detroit announced Amy Andrews win during live broadcasts on Friday, April 18 and Monday, April 21, 2014.

On March 16, 2015, the SRD Favorite Detroit Female Media Personality contest returned for its second year. After 22 days and over 350,000 votes, Lauren Podell of WDIV Local 4 was named the winner.

== Operation format ==
sportsradiodetroit.com was established as an independent media organization offering an alternative to traditional AM/FM sports talk in the Detroit market.

Unlike conventional AM/FM sports talk stations, which feature multiple shows daily and cover all professional teams collectively, sportsradiodetroit.com adopts a "one-to-one" sports talk model. Each of Detroit's four major professional sports teams—along with soccer—has its own dedicated online podcast or radio broadcast. While these shows focus primarily on their respective teams, they also explore broader, national topics within each sport (e.g., Red Wings coverage includes discussions of NHL-wide news).

Beyond podcasts and online radio, sportsradiodetroit.com also provides traditional digital print content, delivering a well-rounded experience for sports fans.

== Media affiliations ==
Sports Radio Detroit was a member of Detroit Sports Media, formerly the Detroit Sports Broadcasters Association. On December 7, 2019, Roger Castillo of SRD was announced as a board member of the organization.
