= WERW (FM) =

Coordinates: 41.919°N 83.437°W

- Monroe, Michigan; United States
- Broadcast area
- Frequency: 94.3 MHz
- Branding: Rewind 94.3

Programming
- Format: Adult contemporary/Classic hits

Ownership
- Owner: Monroe Public Access Cable Television, Inc.

History
- First air date: November 1978 (as WEJY at 97.5)
- Former call signs: WEJY (1978–2005); WYDM (2005–2014)
- Former frequencies: 97.5 MHz (1978–2014)

Technical information
- Licensing authority: FCC
- Facility ID: 43550
- Class: D
- ERP: 78 watts
- HAAT: 30.6 meters

Links
- Public license information: Public file; LMS
- Webcast: Listen Live
- Website: mpactstudio.org

WERW (94.3 FM) is a non-commercial community radio station broadcasting a gold-based adult contemporary music format. Licensed to Monroe, Michigan, it first began broadcasting in 1978 under the WEJY call sign.

WERW is operated by public-access television group Monroe Public Access Cable Television, Inc., and is located on the grounds of Monroe High School. The station actively works to promote local, non-profit organizations as a service to the community, and is Monroe's only locally located and programmed station. Many remote broadcasts for neighborhood nonprofit organizations and civic occasions like the Monroe County Fair and the city's yearly tree-lighting ceremony.

WERW's musical playlist is a blend of CHR and adult contemporary oldies from roughly 1960s to 2014.

The station broadcast on 97.5 MHz until 2014, when it relocated to 94.3 MHz. This was due to CBC Radio One outlet CBEW-FM in Windsor, Ontario, which also broadcasts on 97.5 FM, from a transmitter in McGregor, about 25 miles northeast of Monroe. WERW changed frequencies as it was licensed as a low-powered, Class D radio station, which made them ineligible for protection from interference from its previous location at 97.5. WERW broadcasts from the former student radio station tower at Monroe High School.
