= WHPR-FM =

Coordinates: 42.408°N 83.092°W

Highland Park, Michigan; United States
- Broadcast area: Detroit, Michigan
- Frequency: 88.1 MHz

Programming
- Format: Urban Oldies/Urban Talk

Ownership
- Owner: R.J. Watkins Late Night Entertainment
- Sister stations: WHPS-CD; WVIE (FM)

History
- First air date: May 21, 1954
- Call sign meaning: Highland Park Radio

Technical information
- Licensing authority: FCC
- Facility ID: 54428
- Class: D
- ERP: 44 watts
- HAAT: 105 feet

Links
- Public license information: Public file; LMS
- Website: WHPR-FM

WHPR-FM (88.1 FM) is an Urban Oldies and Talk radio station based in Highland Park, Michigan, owned and operated by R. J.'s Late Night Entertainment Corporation.

== History ==
The station was founded May 21, 1954, by the Highland Park School District; the studio and transmitter were located at Highland Park High School, with the facilities operated by high school students to provide educational radio broadcasting to the community.

When the high school relocated in 1977, the Wayne County Community College District took over the facility as well as the HPHS buildings. On December 20, 1994, the college closed down the campus, and the station was sold to R.J. Watkins, owner of local low-powered station W33BY (then on channel 68 as W68CH). Under Watkins, he reformulated the station as a local station that served the African-American community in the Highland Park area. Under Watkins, the station would relocate its studios and transmitters to its current facility at the corner of Victor and Brush Streets (near the intersection of Woodward Avenue and the Davison Freeway) in Highland Park.

== Violations ==
WHPR-FM was admonished by the FCC in 2001 for running advertising contrary to its status as a "Noncommercial Educational Station." In 2011, the station was fined $22,000 for numerous violations, including relocating its transmitter without FCC authorization, failure to keep a public file and not having any EAS equipment in use (the station's EAS decoder was stored in a closet).

== See also ==
- WHPS-CD
- WVIE (FM)
- Media in Detroit
