= Suznanie =

Suznanie (Consciousness) was a Bulgarian language weekly newspaper published in the United States between December 1923 and 1937. It was published in Chicago by the Bulgarian Section of the Workers Party of America. The initial editor of the paper was Georgi Radulov, who was succeeded in 1924 by Todor Tsekov, who continued at the helm until 1931. At the 4th National Convention of the Workers (Communist) Party, held in Chicago in August 1925, the circulation of the paper was claimed at 1900 copies. Publication of the paper later moved to Detroit. Some copies of the paper exist in Bulgaria but there are no known repositories in North America.
