= CINA (AM) =

Multicultural radio station in Mississauga, Ontario

Coordinates: 43°37′32″N 79°37′52″W

- Mississauga, Ontario; Canada
- Broadcast area: Greater Toronto
- Frequency: 1650 kHz
- Branding: CINA 1650

Programming
- Format: South Asian community

Ownership
- Owner: Neeti Prakash Ray (CINA Media Group)
- Sister stations: CHAM (AM), CINA-FM

History
- First air date: December 2008
- Call sign meaning: International or India

Technical information
- Licensing authority: CRTC
- Class: B
- Power: 5,000 watts (days); 680 watts (nights); 1,000 watts (critical hours)

Links
- Website: cinaradio.com

CINA (1650 kHz) is a commercial AM radio station, licensed to Mississauga, Ontario, Canada and serving the Greater Toronto area. It broadcasts a South Asian format of talk radio, all-news radio and music shows.

It is owned by Neeti Prakash Ray, who co-owns a sister station in Windsor, CINA-FM.

By day, CINA is powered at 5,000 watts; however, to protect other stations from interference, it reduces power to 680 watts at night. During critical hours, the power is 1,000 watts. A non-directional antenna is used. The transmitter is on Eglinton Avenue East at Tomken Road in Mississauga.

== Overview ==
The station application was approved by the Canadian Radio-television and Telecommunications Commission (CRTC) on April 23, 2007. It began testing in late 2008. The official sign-on was in December 2008.

CINA focuses most of its airtime on Indian and Pakistani audiences, airing a mixture of community-oriented talk programming with Bollywood and other South Asian music. Owner Neeti Prakash Ray was formerly the host of Radio India, a popular local radio show which aired on CKTB in the 1990s. CINA's format is based in large part on that program.

On March 14, 2011, CINA received CRTC approval to increase the daytime transmitter power to 5,000 watts from the previous power of 1,000 watts. The nighttime power remains at 680 watts and all other technical parameters are unchanged.

== Programming ==
CINA AM caters predominantly to the South Asian community. The station features programming in the following languages: Hindi, Bengali, Gujarati, Punjabi and Urdu. It also airs some Armenian and Indo-Caribbean programming on weekends.
