= CKWW =

Radio station in Windsor, Ontario, Canada

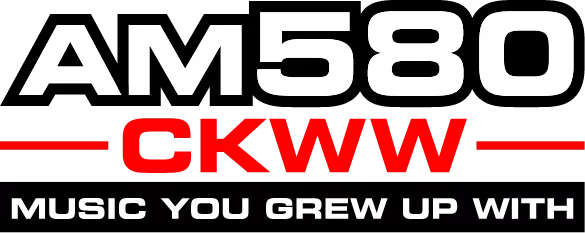
- Windsor, Ontario; Canada
- Broadcast area: Southwestern Ontario; Detroit–Windsor
- Frequency: 580 kHz (AM)
- Branding: AM 580

Programming
- Format: Classic hits

Ownership
- Owner: Neeti Prakash Ray (CINA Media Group)
- Sister stations: CINA-FM

History
- First air date: March 29, 1964
- Call sign meaning: "Wonderful Windsor"

Technical information
- Licensing authority: CRTC
- Class: C
- Power: 500 watts
- Transmitter coordinates: 42°10′22″N 83°2′53″W

Links
- Website: am580ckww.com

CKWW (580 AM) is a Canadian radio station in Windsor, Ontario. It is owned by Neeti Prakash Ray and is part of the CINA Media Group. The station airs a classic hits format targeted to the Windsor/Detroit market. Most of the playlist is made up of hits from the 1960s and 1970s. The studios and offices are on Ouellette Avenue in Windsor.

CKWW's transmitter is on Concession Road 4N in Amherstburg, Ontario. The station transmits 500 watts, using a directional antenna to protect other Canadian and U.S. stations broadcasting on 580 AM.

== History ==
The original applicant for the CKWW licence was Royce Frith (later to be a Canadian Senator). But Frith sold the station to Geoff Stirling before it went to air. The station was launched by Stirling on March 29, 1964.

Initially CKWW featured a middle of the road (MOR) or "good music" format with a heavy news and information commitment, making it the Windsor equivalent of Detroit's WJR. The morning host was Norm Aldred, with news delivered by Stan Switzer and sports with Al Shaver (who was also the station manager). Other disc jockeys included Ron Burgoyne in the afternoons and Richard "Dick" Gasparini hosting an all-night program called "Music 'til Dawn," at one point totally sponsored by a well-known tobacco company. Popular recording artists featured on a regular basis included Frank Sinatra, George Shearing, Peggy Lee, Andy Williams, Nat King Cole, The Four Freshmen and Barbra Streisand.

In 1967, sister station CKWW-FM was launched (later CJOM and now CIMX-FM). Stirling sold the stations in 1984, and the station dropped its MOR music programming to adopt a news/talk format in 1989.

In February 1993, CHUM Limited acquired CKLW and CKLW-FM as well. CKLW (by then a "Music of Your Life" adult standards station) and CKWW swapped formats on March 1 of that year, with CKLW becoming the news/talk outlet and CKWW adopting the adult standards format.

=== As an oldies station ===

In 2005, CKWW changed its on-air moniker from 580 Memories to AM 580 Motor City Favorites. It dropped all jingles and added more uptempo hits from the 1960s through 1990s plus some adult contemporary chart recurrents while dropping most of its pre-1960 titles, in an attempt to appeal to a younger audience. The change in the music proved largely unpopular with fans of the old standards format.

In October 2006, in response to 104.3 WOMC eliminating the word "oldies" from its on-air positioning, CKWW revamped its playlist once more to focus primarily on music from the late 1950s through the late 1970s while dropping all post-1980 material. CKWW now played many of the oldies hits originally heard during the Top 40 era of CKLW, then known as The Big 8. Although still known as AM 580, Motor City Favorites, the station returned jingles to its on-air presentation and added the taglines "Great Fun! Great Oldies!" and "All Oldies, All the Time" to its slogans.

AM 580 played up its connections to Windsor/Detroit's Top 40 radio past on the air, as the station's top-of-the-hour identification mentions that the station "broadcasts from the legendary studios of The Big 8" (at 1640 Ouellette Avenue in Windsor) and also features the widely recognized instrumental signature tunes from CKLW's glory years.

In 2007 CKWW along with the other CHUM stations were sold to CTVglobemedia. In 2011, CTVglobemedia was acquired by Bell Media.

In June 2012, CKWW began airing the syndicated American Top 40 - The 70s with Casey Kasem from 7-10 p.m. on Sundays and Tuesdays, but scaled it back in mid-2013 to a once-weekly broadcast in the Sunday evening time slot. Other weekend specialty programming includes Breakfast with The Beatles, Money Matters, Elvis Only!, Shake, Rattle, Showtime and the Sunday Oldies Show. In the spring of 2020, The Roger Ashby Oldies Show was added to the weekly program list, airing on Saturday mornings. In addition, CKWW also has Back to the 70's with host M.G. Kelly, airing on Saturday nights; Live from the 60s rebroadcasts with the Real Don Steele, airing on Friday nights; and Breakfast With the Beatles with host Dennis Mitchell, airing on Sunday mornings.

=== Sale to CINA Media Group ===
On June 14, 2023, as part of a mass corporate restructuring at Bell Media, the company shut down six of their AM radio stations nationwide, and announced their intention to sell three others, including CKWW. In November 2023, Neeti P. Ray—owner of multilingual station CINA-FM—filed an application with the CRTC to acquire CKWW, as well as Bell's Hamilton AM stations CHAM and CKOC, for $445,000. Ray's applications stated he intended to continue operating the stations under the same terms and conditions as the existing licences. The applications were approved on June 26, 2024.

On August 19, 2024, CKWW was relaunched by the new ownership, flipping from oldies to classic hits with a focus on music from the 1970s and 1980s. Mornings would be hosted by Mark Lander and Kara Ro; Lander had previously been at CIDR-FM for twenty years while Ro had been a broadcaster at CKLW and CKUE-FM. New general manager Al Pervin stated that CKWW planned to feature more local news and information programming covering Windsor, with the new management believing that the previous format had performed poorly in the ratings.

== See also ==
- Media in Detroit
