= CBET-DT =

Television station in Windsor, Ontario

- Windsor, Ontario; Canada
- Channels: Digital: 9 (VHF); Virtual: 9
- Branding: CBC Windsor

Programming
- Affiliations: 9.1: CBC Television

Ownership
- Owner: Canadian Broadcasting Corporation
- Sister stations: CBEW-FM, CBE-FM, CBEF

History
- First air date: September 16, 1954
- Former call signs: CKLW-TV (1954–1975)
- Former channel numbers: Analog: 9 (VHF, 1954–2011)
- Former affiliations: Both secondary: DuMont (1954–1956); CTV (1970–early 1980s)
- Call sign meaning: CBC Essex County Television

Technical information
- Licensing authority: CRTC
- ERP: 26 kW
- HAAT: 190.6 m (625 ft)
- Transmitter coordinates: 42°9′9″N 82°57′5″W

Links
- Website: CBC Windsor

CBET-DT (channel 9) is a CBC Television station in Windsor, Ontario, Canada. The station's studios are located on Riverside Drive West and Crawford Avenue (near the Detroit River) in Downtown Windsor, and its transmitter is located near Concession Road 12 in Essex.

Residents of the U.S. city of Detroit, Michigan, also receive CBET over-the-air as well as on cable.

== History ==
=== As CKLW-TV ===
By 1953, CBC Television's distribution throughout Canada was growing. The Windsor market, however, was already being served by the Detroit stations across the border. That same year, Western Ontario Broadcasting Company, Ltd., parent company of CKLW radio (800 AM and 93.9 FM, now CIDR-FM), applied for a television licence for Windsor. The city's Chamber of Commerce approved the deal on March 28, 1953, feeling that the market was lacking in a television station that was distinctly Canadian in nature.

The station first signed on the air at 2:50 p.m. (Note: The first program was an afternoon prayer, followed by a community billboard, then the Paul Dixon Show at 3 p.m.) on September 16, 1954, as CKLW-TV. Channel 9, which was the first television station in Windsor and the 15th station to go on the air in Canada, originally operated as a CBC affiliate, though it also maintained a secondary affiliation with the DuMont Television Network (which was shared with Detroit's WJBK, channel 2) until that network's demise in 1956.

In March 1956, American industrial and communications firm General Tire and Rubber purchased a controlling interest in Western Ontario Broadcasting. This move, done through General Tire's broadcasting subsidiary General Teleradio, made the CKLW stations perhaps the only stations in Canada to be owned by an American company. In 1959, General Teleradio was renamed RKO General. In 1963, RKO bought out Western Ontario Broadcasting's other shareholders and gained full ownership of the CKLW stations. CKLW-AM-FM-TV was now fully integrated with RKO General's American broadcast interests, located in New York City, Memphis, San Francisco, Los Angeles, Boston, Washington, D.C., and Hartford, Connecticut, among other cities. CKLW-TV transmitted its programming in black and white until October 1966, when it upgraded its transmitter and began broadcasting in colour.

==== Programming ====
Under RKO's ownership, CKLW-TV aired only the minimum block of CBC programming. During this period, the CBC carried a number of American originated shows that were also broadcast on the Detroit stations; these programs, however, were blacked out on CKLW-TV because Windsor was, then as now, considered part of the Detroit market. The blackout of American network shows allowed RKO General an opportunity to reach the more lucrative American audience across the border. Outside of network programming, most of channel 9's schedule consisted of the standard fare of independent stations in the United States—old movies, cartoons, children's programs and off-network syndicated programming. Its lineup was similar to the programming on RKO's two American independent stations, WOR-TV in New York City (now MyNetworkTV O&O WWOR-TV in Secaucus, New Jersey) and KHJ-TV in Los Angeles (now KCAL-TV). Much like its radio counterparts (especially CKLW-AM, which became a Top 40 powerhouse in the Detroit market in the mid-1960s), the station appeared more American than Canadian.

There was some local programming and personalities during this era, including Toby David as Captain Jolly, Art Cervi as Bozo the Clown (who would later move to WJBK), and Bill Kennedy hosting Bill Kennedy's Showtime (which would soon relocate to WKBD-TV (channel 50) under that name, renamed Bill Kennedy at the Movies by the start of 1972; CKLW would retain the Showtime title). Another popular show on CKLW-TV during the 1960s was Swingin' Time, a local teenage dance party show similar to American Bandstand, hosted by WKNR (now WDTW) radio personality Robin Seymour (and also, for a time, CKLW radio's Tom Shannon). The show featured recording artists, both nationally and locally popular, lip-synching to their latest releases while teenagers showcased the latest dances on the show's huge dance floor. Due to the show's connection to Detroit's popular rock-and-roll AM radio stations, Swingin' Time was used by many artists, especially local acts such as The Supremes, Martha Reeves and the Vandellas, the MC5, and Mitch Ryder, to reach a substantially larger teen audience than they could have achieved through solely working the record hop circuit.

==== Transition ====
Through the 1968 Broadcasting Act, the Canadian Radio-television Commission (the forerunner to today's Canadian Radio-television and Telecommunications Commission (CRTC)) decreed that broadcast stations licensed within Canada must be at least 80 percent owned by Canadians. With this ordinance in effect, RKO General announced that it would put the CKLW stations up for sale on July 10, 1969. Western Ontario Broadcasting's licence to operate the stations was renewed until September 1, 1970, and in 1969, General Tire decided to get out altogether rather than accept a 20 percent share.

Two Canadian broadcasting firms, Maclean Hunter (which owned CTV station CFCN-TV in Calgary), and Baton Broadcasting (owners of Toronto's CTV flagship station CFTO-TV), made a joint offer to purchase the stations, but were turned down by the CRTC. Both Maclean Hunter and Baton wanted to convert CKLW-TV into a CTV affiliate, which was an unrealistic prospect, given the large number of American imports on CTV's schedule. Maclean Hunter also owned CFCO in Chatham (also in the Windsor–Detroit market), and neither company could agree whether to sell CFCO or the CKLW stations. Baton was undeterred in its quest and reapplied again, and with a new partner—the CBC, which had wanted an owned-and-operated station in southwestern Ontario for some time. Baton and CBC formed a holding company, known as St. Clair River Broadcasting Ltd., which was 75 percent owned by Baton; the CBC held the remaining 25 percent. This time, the CRTC approved the application, and on February 27, 1970, the CBC/Baton alliance took control of CKLW-TV. St. Clair River was granted a five-year licence by the CRTC to operate the station, after which Baton would sell full ownership to the CBC. Meanwhile, Baton took sole control of CKLW-AM-FM, operating them until they were sold to CUC Broadcasting in 1984 and to CHUM Limited in 1993. The radio outlets are now owned by Bell Media Radio, successor-in-interest to Baton, after Bell acquired CHUM in 2007.

When CBC/Baton took over, more Canadian-produced programming was added to channel 9's schedule, including programs from CTV, such as People in Conflict, Here Come the '70s, The Pig and Whistle and The Starlost. The CTV programming was mainly seen in place of CBC's American programming as a result of border protection rules prohibiting the broadcast of American programs to which Detroit stations had superior broadcast rights. Channel 9 also carried CTV's mid-week NHL hockey telecasts, as well as games from the Stanley Cup playoffs and finals, when CTV held the rights. Before the sale, and especially before Detroit's WKBD-TV went on the air in 1965, CKLW-TV was often likely to preempt games involving the Toronto Maple Leafs if the Montreal Canadiens hosted the Detroit Red Wings on Hockey Night in Canada.

After its sale, CKLW-TV also produced a significant amount of local programming that ranged from music and variety to daytime talk, sports, agriculture, current affairs and documentaries. CKLW-TV was the first CBC station (and, prior to 2009, possibly the only station) to produce a 90-minute local, national and international newscast during the supper hour. During the 1972 football season, CKLW-TV aired the weekly Alex Karras Football Show, hosted by former Detroit Lion Alex Karras.

=== As CBET ===
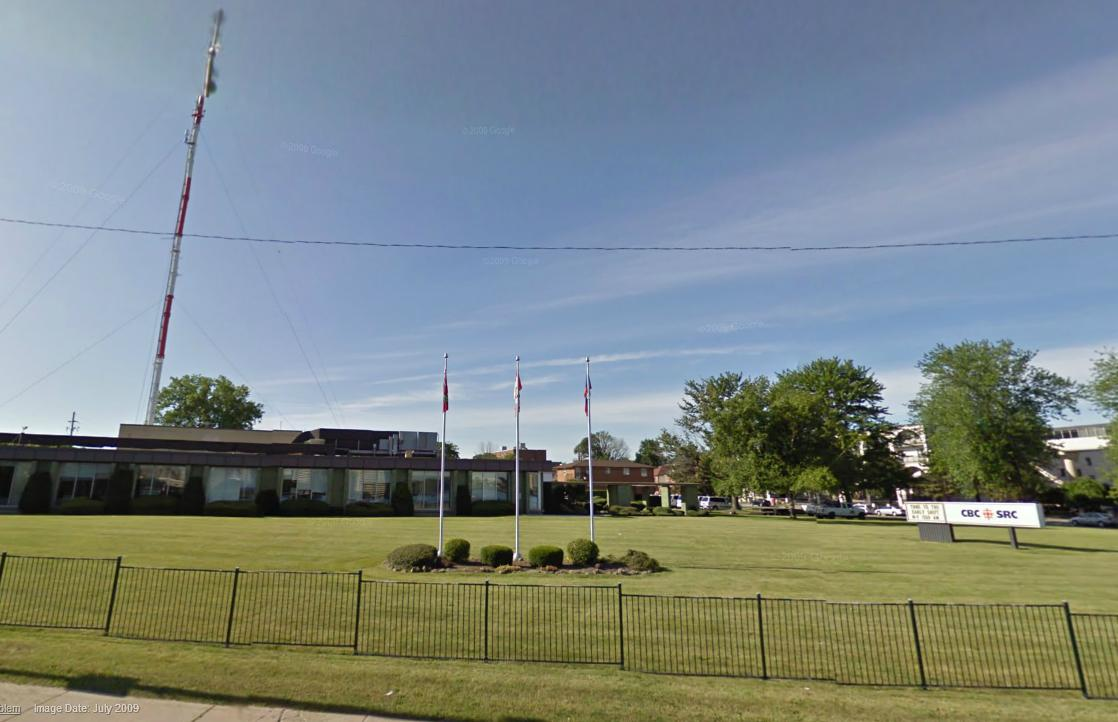
CBC studios in Windsor, Ontario

The Baton/CBC partnership in CKLW-TV ended in May 1975 when, per the original 1970 arrangement, the CBC purchased Baton's 75 percent ownership stake in St. Clair River Broadcasting. Channel 9 became a CBC owned-and-operated station on September 1, 1975, and changed its call letters to CBET. The station's schedule did not change much early on; it still featured the same formula of CBC and CTV programs, along with British and American television shows (mostly reruns and movies) with Detroit rights. CBET also carried some special programming aimed at American viewers, such as the annual Weekend With the Stars telethon for United Cerebral Palsy in the early 1980s. CTV content on CBET would remain at some capacity through the 1980s, despite the fact that after the CBC took full control of channel 9 in 1975, Kitchener-based CTV affiliate CKCO-TV signed on a repeater transmitter in Sarnia on channel 42, with a signal that reached Windsor at least marginally.

The station also sometimes purchased rights to sports programming, such as Maple Leafs games from CHCH-TV in Hamilton in the early 1980s, after CHCH picked up the mid-week rights from CFTO in 1977. CBET was known as "CBET 9" when it first adopted the new call letters, and later branded as "TV 9 Windsor".

==== Budget cuts ====
In 1985, a major budget reduction decimated all locally produced programs by the CBC except for news, even though CBET was one of the few profitable CBC stations in Canada. The 90-minute evening news program Newsday remained as well as late and weekend news programs, but the music, variety, daytime talk and the popular Reach for the Top were all cancelled. On December 5, 1990, CBC closed down most of CBET's newsroom, leaving with a small news bureau. It resulted in protests from Windsor area residents. A large rally of about 5,000 citizens marched down Riverside Drive West to the station in protest.

A "Save Our Station" committee was formed and politicians on every level lobbied both CBC and the Canadian government to preserve the Windsor operation. Only three reporters remained at CBET, who produced stories for the early evening newscast on Toronto sister station CBLT. First came 5:30 Live, which was followed by CBC Evening News with Bill Cameron (which earlier was known as CBC at 6 on CBLT).

==== The Windsor experiment ====
With an editorial and tech staff of about 32, CBC reinstated local news in pilot project form. New operating methods and new technologies were introduced. This meant videojournalists (cross-skilling) multi-skilling, and the use of non-linear editing technology (AVID NewsCutters and air-play for news item playback). The Windsor Council was also formed. This group made up of managers and union reps oversaw the progress of the "experiment" and dealt with issues that arose on an almost weekly basis. The new methods of the operation paved way for some of the new language in the collective agreements reached in 1996–97.

Windsor was not only in the spotlight in the CBC, but was also of interest to many other broadcasters and union leaders across the country. Two local half-hour news programs were produced when CBET presented the Windsor Evening News, anchored by Carole MacNeil, at 5:30 p.m. and the Windsor Late News at 11 p.m. (CBET would continue to show the Toronto-based CBC Evening News at 6 p.m.)

In the mid-1990s, the CBC increased the amount of Canadian-produced programming on its schedule. However, the few American shows left on CBC Television had disappeared from CBET some years before. These shows were replaced with older CBC programs or shows from other Commonwealth countries, such as the popular British television drama Coronation Street (a national CBC program) and the Australian drama, Neighbours (exclusive to CBET at first, but which later began to be distributed nationally).

The station had also moved its transmitter tower from Downtown Windsor to near McGregor in 2002, by dismantling the top 600 feet (180 m) and erecting it as a new structure. The bottom 400 feet (120 m) still remained for the analog signal on channel 9, while the new tower houses the digital signals for CBET (post-transition digital channel 9) and CICO-TV-32 (TVOntario), and for unrealized digital facilities for CBEFT (post-transition digital channel 35, or virtual channel 54.1).

==== Sale of studio ====
On September 8, 2014, it was announced that the CBC would be selling its Riverside Drive studio complex to Clayland Developments Ltd. of London, Ontario for $1,425,000. The CBC would continue its operations at the complex, leasing 13,000 square feet of the 32,000 square-foot complex from Clayland on a ten-year lease. While employees would relocate out of areas not leased by the CBC, the transition was not expected to be noticed by viewers and listeners. The 1954 building is on Windsor's heritage registry, meaning that it could not be torn down without approval by the city government.

==== Sports ====
The CBC's sports programming, including Hockey Night in Canada and its coverage of the Olympic Games, has historically been quite popular in the Detroit area, sometimes even more popular than American network coverage of the same events.

During the CBC's original run of Toronto Blue Jays telecasts (before Sportsnet's 2004 takeover), Jays games were often subject to blackout on CBET in order to protect Detroit Tigers home games available on broadcast stations. During 2007, CBC carried eight Jays games; CBET was able to air all CBC Jays games that season. However, blackouts returned during the 2008 season. Jays telecasts on CBC was discontinued beginning with the 2009 season, with Sportsnet and TSN having exclusive carriage within Canada.

Conversely, CBC's National Hockey League coverage is not subject to local blackout. During Hockey Night in Canada, CBET often aired games involving the Detroit Red Wings in lieu of Ontario's designated game when available, during both the regular season and the playoffs (such as a Western Conference quarter-final series in 2006 against the Edmonton Oilers, many of which were originally designated to air regionally on Edmonton's CBC station CBXT). As 2014–15 season, with Rogers Communications taking over the production of HNIC and broadcasting other games on its services, Red Wings games only air on CBET during Hockey Night if they are involved in the game allotted to CBC, as games are no longer split regionally.

==== American programming preemptions and other variances ====
As Windsor is part of the Detroit market, CBET is required to preempt American shows on the CBC network schedule of which exclusive rights are claimed by American stations in the market. Most American programming that was part of the CBC schedule throughout Canada (except for children's programs that met E/I regulations) could not be broadcast by CBET and, thus, was replaced by other programming.

As of the 2011–12 season, these programs were Wheel of Fortune (which aired on the national CBC schedule at 4:30 p.m.) and Jeopardy! (7:30 p.m.). These preemptions were due to Detroit rightsholder WDIV-TV (channel 4), which airs both programs during the 7 p.m. hour. This ended at the start of the 2012–13 season, as the CBC decided not to renew its rights to Wheel and Jeopardy! when its contract to run both shows expired, and replaced the shows with Canadian-produced programming.

CBET handled these anomalies (as well as its one-hour 6 p.m. local newscast, which as noted below differs from most CBC stations) by airing repeats of Rick Mercer Report or 22 Minutes at 4:30 p.m., various documentaries from the CBC library at 5 p.m. (different from the ones aired across the network at 1 p.m.), and Coronation Street from 7 to 8 p.m. (whereas Corrie airs from 6:30 to 7:30 on most other stations).

Following the CBC's removal of Wheel and Jeopardy! in the fall of 2012, some evening programming variations remain, with Rick Mercer Report at 5 p.m., various programming (specials, documentaries, and repeats of other shows) at 5:30 p.m., and the one-hour 6 p.m. local newscast, with the remainder of the schedule in pattern with the other CBC stations (including Coronation Street, which is reduced to a single episode weeknights at 7:30 p.m. on the CBC network). After CBET's expansion of its supper-hour newscast in September 2013, variances involve Rick Mercer Report at 5 p.m. (seen on other stations at 6:30 p.m.), and a simulcast of the 11 p.m. newscast from sister station CBLT-DT in Toronto instead of its own late news program.

Despite all of the U.S. preemptions, however, some shows on the CBC Kids lineup, including Arthur, Daniel Tiger's Neighborhood, and Molly of Denali (which could also be seen on PBS member station WTVS in Detroit), are not affected due to them being E/I compliant, and thus are not subject to preemption on CBET.

== News operation ==
CBET-DT presently broadcasts 5 hours, 50 minutes of locally produced newscasts each week (with 1 hour, 10 minutes each weekday); in regards to the number of hours devoted to news programming, it is the lowest local newscast output among CBC Television's owned-and-operated stations. On October 2, 2000, local news programming on CBET and other CBC owned-and-operated stations was reduced to a half-hour each weeknight, and late newscasts were cancelled. With the introduction of Canada Now (which began at CBET before it went national), CBC's new hybrid hour-long dinnertime newscast at 6 p.m. made its debut. National news segments originated from Vancouver and were anchored by Ian Hanomansing, with the Windsor segment broadcast from the CBET studios presented by Blake Roberts.

Carole MacNeil would move to Toronto to anchor the Toronto segment there; she would later co-anchor with Evan Solomon on the CBC network's Sunday morning news program, CBC News: Sunday, and its nighttime complement, CBC News: Sunday Night. As a result of the dinnertime news change, CBC's local news operations faced some layoffs—especially CBET, which terminated ten of its 29 news staffers. Prior to the 2006 format change, Canada Now was last locally anchored by Susan Pedler with Tony Doucette from a state-of-the-art news set inside the CBET newsroom.

On January 9, 2006, under the CBC's local programming expansion initiative, CBET's newscasts were renamed as CBC News at Six, with the national half-hour remaining as Canada Now. Most CBC owned-and-operated stations also began offering expanded local newscasts under the CBC News at Six name.

On November 30, 2006, CBC announced plans to discontinue Canada Now in February 2007, in favour of hour-long early evening local newscasts on its stations. While CBCT-DT in Charlottetown, Prince Edward Island, decided to name its new supper hour newscast Compass and CBUT-DT in Vancouver kept the Canada Now title, CBET retained the CBC News at Six brand rather than returning to its original Newsday title. Susan Pedler would continue as lead anchor, with Jim Lagogians on sports and Tara Weber reporting on weather. CBET later renamed its newscast to CBC News: Windsor at Six, following the lead of most of its sister stations across Canada by inserting the city's name into the newscast title.

In September 2009, most CBC stations began to carry a 90-minute block of local news from 5 to 6:30 p.m. each weeknight; however, CBET opted to keep its hour-long newscast at 6 p.m. In addition to the main 6 p.m. newscast, CBET introduced a 10-minute late night newscast CBC News: Windsor Late Night on October 26, 2009, which aired at 10:55 p.m. each weeknight following The National. On July 3, 2012, Pedler announced that she would take a leave of absence for a year, as she was adopting a baby girl.

On September 2, 2013, CBET expanded its early evening newscast to 90 minutes from 5:30 to 7 p.m., while it discontinued its 11 p.m. newscast in turn; besides differing from the early evening newscast slot of most CBC Television stations (5:30 to 7 p.m. on CBET, as opposed to 5 to 6:30 p.m. elsewhere), this differed from most CBC O&Os in other markets where stations carry both an early and late evening newscast; in lieu of its own 11 p.m. newscast, CBET simulcasts the newscast from CBLT instead. Asha Tomlinson, who previously worked the breaking news desk at CBC News Network, became anchor of the expanded newscast; she replaced Amanda Ferguson (who became anchor during Pedler's maternity leave) as anchor.

== Technical information ==
=== Subchannel ===
Subchannel of CBET-DT
Subchannel	Res.	Short name	Programming
9.1	720p	CBET-DT	CBC

=== Analog-to-digital conversion ===
CBET shut down its analog signal at 11:58 p.m. on August 31, 2011, when Canadian television stations in CRTC-designated mandatory markets transitioned from analog to digital broadcasts, and flash-cut its digital signal into operation on VHF channel 9 three minutes later at 12:01 a.m. on September 1. While the CBC originally planned on requesting that analog operations for CBET and some of its other stations be extended by one year, taking those stations digital in 2012, the corporation later revised its plan, and converted all of its originating stations to digital in August 2011.

== Coverage ==
Over-the-air, CBET can be received in Cleveland and Toledo, Ohio, with a very strong and reliable rooftop and/or indoor antenna. The station was also listed in some TV Guide editions in northern Ohio. Prior to July 31, 2012, CBET was the only CBC-owned station not to have any repeaters; transmitters in Sarnia and Chatham instead relayed CBLN-TV, which was CBC's London-based Southwestern Ontario repeater network, rebroadcasting Toronto's CBLT, but with variations in advertising and some programming.

CBET is carried on cable providers in Metro Detroit and much of Southeast Michigan, as far away as Flint and East Lansing. In Northwest Ohio, CBET is carried on Toledo-based Buckeye Broadband, which serves areas as far east as Sandusky. During a carriage dispute with the market's local NBC affiliate WNWO-TV, Buckeye temporarily moved CBET to WNWO's standard and high-definition channel allotments to ensure that viewers would still have access to coverage of the 2014 Winter Olympics.

Until January 2009, CBET maintained cable coverage as far south as Findlay, Ohio. This ended when Time Warner Cable (now Charter Spectrum) dropped CBET as well as Columbus' CBS affiliate, WBNS-TV, from its Northwestern Ohio systems. CBET is still carried on Spectrum's system in Port Clinton.

== See also ==
- CBEFT (now-defunct Radio-Canada outlet)
- List of CBC television stations
- Media in Windsor, Ontario
- Media in Detroit
