= WVIE (FM) =

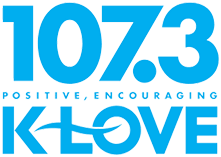
- Charlotte Amalie, U.S. Virgin Islands; United States
- Frequency: 107.3 MHz

Programming
- Format: Contemporary Christian
- Network: K-Love

Ownership
- Owner: Educational Media Foundation
- Sister stations: WJKL

History
- First air date: 1991
- Former call signs: WVNX (1991–1998); WVGN (1998–2015)
- Former frequencies: 97.1 MHz (1991-2001)
- Call sign meaning: Virgin Islands Radio Entertainment

Technical information
- Licensing authority: FCC
- Facility ID: 14999
- Class: A
- ERP: 1,650 watts
- HAAT: 439 meters (1,440 ft)
- Transmitter coordinates: 18°21′24″N 64°57′59″W

Links
- Public license information: Public file; LMS
- Webcast: Listen live
- Website: klove.com

WVIE (107.3 FM) is a non-commercial radio station licensed to Charlotte Amalie, U.S. Virgin Islands, United States. Owned by Educational Media Foundation, it carries programming from the K-Love network.

== Ownership ==
The station, then known as WVGN, was acquired by Caribbean Broadcasting Network (then known as LKK Group; Keith Bass, President) from Calypso Communications in 2002.

While Caribbean Broadcasting Network is a company whose television stations are affiliates of commercial networks, WVGN was operated under a separate arm, Caribbean Community Broadcasting, and solicited and accepted donations from listeners, as would most other NPR members.

Caribbean Broadcasting Network reached a deal to sell WVGN to R.J. Watkins, owner of WHPR-FM and operator of W33BY-D in Detroit, on August 7, 2014; the sale was completed on February 17, 2015, accompanied by a call sign change to WVIE. WVGN's NPR programming continued through March 15, 2015; Watkins replaced this programming with contemporary music and talk shows.

Since November 7, 2015, WVIE's signal was simulcast on W33BY's 3rd subchannel. Until then, it had been a SD simulcast of 33.1, 33.2 and 33.4, however, are still simulcasting W33BY-DT1 in SD.

=== Sale to Educational Media Foundation ===
On March 14, 2023, it was announced that the Educational Media Foundation was buying WVIE for $150,000. The station would be EMF's second located in a U.S. territory and would switch to the company's K-Love network. The sale was completed on May 26, 2023.
