= CBEF =

Radio station in Windsor, Ontario, Canada

- Windsor, Ontario; Canada
- Frequency: 1550 kHz
- Branding: Ici Radio-Canada Première

Programming
- Language: French
- Format: News/Talk

Ownership
- Owner: Canadian Broadcasting Corporation
- Sister stations: CBEW-FM; CBE-FM; CBET-DT

History
- First air date: May 18, 1970
- Former frequencies: 540 kHz (1970–2013)
- Call sign meaning: Canadian Broadcasting Corporation Essex County French

Technical information
- Licensing authority: CRTC
- Class: A (Clear-channel)
- Power: 10,000 watts
- Transmitter coordinates: 42°12′56″N 82°55′15″W

Links
- Website: Ici Radio-Canada Première

CBEF (1550 kHz) is a non-commercial French-language public radio station in Windsor, Ontario. It airs the programming of Société Radio-Canada's Ici Radio-Canada Première network.

CBEF is a Class A station broadcasting on the clear-channel frequency of 1550 AM, the only full power station on this frequency in Canada. Most clear channel stations broadcast with 50,000 watts, the maximum permitted for Canadian AM stations, but CBEF transmits with 10,000 watts. It uses a directional antenna, located off Talbot Road (Route 3) in Tecumseh, Ontario. CBEF is also heard on three FM rebroadcasters in Southern Ontario: a nested rebroadcaster also in Windsor, CBEF-2-FM on 105.5 MHz, as well as 101.5 in Sarnia and 103.1 in Leamington.

CBEF was launched on May 18, 1970, as Windsor's first French-language radio station. It originally broadcast on AM 540, until taking over the 1550 frequency in 2013.

== Programming ==
CBEF's local morning program is Matins sans frontières. The station also airs the regional afternoon program L'heure de pointe Toronto from CJBC in Toronto. On Saturday mornings, the station carries the wake up show À échelle humaine, also heard on CBON-FM in Sudbury and CJBC. On public holidays, the morning show Matins sans frontières airs as usual and the afternoon show Pas comme d'habitude is heard on CBEF, CBON and CJBC.

In the CBC's programming cuts announced on March 26, 2009, almost all of CBEF's local programming was slated for cancellation, meaning that the station would become effectively a rebroadcaster of CJBC except for a skeleton staff of two anchors to present local news updates during the day and report on breaking news. A local lobby group, "SOS-CBEF", organized to oppose the cutbacks. The group's request for an injunction against the change was denied in July, due to the presiding judge ruling that she did not have the appropriate legal jurisdiction to issue an injunction.

Matins sans frontières, a one-hour local morning program hosted by Charles Lévesque, was reinstated from September 7, 2010, and in May 2013 was expanded to two hours. As of summer 2015, it expanded to three hours. The station continues to rebroadcast CJBC in other local programming blocks.

At the Canadian Radio-television and Telecommunications Commission (CRTC)'s license renewal for the CBC's services in 2013, the commission directed the network to maintain at least 15 hours per week of local programming on CBEF during the 2013-18 license term, due to the lack of other French-language radio services in Windsor.

== Transmitters ==
The station has a rebroadcast transmitter (CBEF-1-FM) in Leamington, on 103.1 FM. Due to AM reception issues in downtown Windsor, CBEF was also approved by the CRTC to operate a 620-watt nested rebroadcaster in Windsor on 105.5 MHz, provided that does not interfere with stations at or near this frequency, such as WQQO in Toledo, Ohio or WWCK-FM in Flint, Michigan, both Top 40 stations owned by Cumulus Media. The call sign for the rebroadcaster on 105.5 FM is CBEF-2-FM, signing on the air on April 1, 2012.

In May 2012, the CBC filed paperwork with the CRTC, seeking permission to move CBEF to CBE's previous transmitter and frequency of 1550 AM with 10,000 watts. It also sought permission to establish a low-powered FM rebroadcaster (CBEF-3-FM) on 98.3 MHz in Sarnia. The change was requested due to concerns that rust was affecting the obsolete 540 facility, and that nearby hydro electric lines were also affecting its signal. The move, as requested, was approved by the CRTC on October 16, 2012. The station was given until October 16, 2014, to either implement the move or request an extension beyond that date. CBEF began simulcasting on 1550 AM in November 2012, with messages to listeners to switch over to the new frequency. The 540 transmitter was turned off a few weeks later. The 1550 frequency was previously used by CBEF's English-language sister station, but that station converted to the FM band in 2013 and is now CBEW-FM 97.5 MHz.

Although 1550 AM has been a Canadian clear-channel since its creation by the 1941 North American Regional Broadcasting Agreement (NARBA), both CBE and co-channel XERUV in Xalapa, Mexico, were limited to 10 kW instead of the normal 50 kW afforded to clear-channels. The 1550 AM facility operates with a directional pattern to the northeast, both to aim its signal toward Ontario and avoid interference with the now-defunct XERUV, which operated non-directionally.

On September 1, 2016, the CBC applied for permission to move the transmitter in Sarnia (CBEF-3-FM) from 98.3 to 101.5 MHz. The technical parameters for the move include a constant power of 1,886 watts and a height of 107.4 meters EHAAT on the same tower as CKCI-FM. This would improve the station's coverage throughout Sarnia and the immediate Port Huron area, though it may be subject to co-channel interference from WWBN in Flint, Michigan, in the fringes of its listening area to the west of Port Huron. The station would also become short-spaced to WRVF in Toledo, Ohio, also on 101.5, as well as CKNX-FM in Wingham on 101.7 and CKOT-FM in Tillsonburg on 101.3 MHz. The CBC's application to move CBEF-3-FM to 101.5 MHz (with a change in power from 2,320 to 1,886 watts) was approved on February 3, 2017. On May 28, 2018, CBEF-3-FM moved to 101.5 MHz.

On July 8, 2024, the CRTC published applications by the CBC to reassign CJBC-4-FM (99.3 MHz), the London transmitter of CJBC Toronto, to the licence of CBEF, following a request by a coalition of Francophone groups in the London area to receive the Windsor station's programming.

== Rebroadcasters ==
Rebroadcasters of CBEF
| City of licence | Identifier | Frequency | Power | Class | RECNet | CRTC Decision | Notes |
|---|---|---|---|---|---|---|---|
| Leamington | CBEF-1-FM | 103.1 FM | 1,000 watts | A | Query | | 42°6′46.08″N 82°39′51.84″W |
| Windsor | CBEF-2-FM | 105.5 FM | 620 watts | A | Query | | 42°18′59.04″N 83°2′57.84″W |
| Sarnia | CBEF-3-FM | 101.5 FM | 1,886 watts | A | Query | | 42°54′30.96″N 82°20′18.96″W |

== See also ==
- Media in Windsor, Ontario
- Media in Detroit
