= CINA-FM =

Ethnic radio station in Windsor, Ontario

Coordinates: 42°17′50″N 83°01′31″W

- Windsor, Ontario; Canada
- Broadcast area: Southwestern Ontario, Detroit–Windsor
- Frequency: 102.3 MHz
- Branding: Radio CINA

Programming
- Format: Multilingual

Ownership
- Owner: Neeti P. Ray
- Sister stations: CINA, CKWW

History
- First air date: September 6, 2012

Technical information
- Class: A
- ERP: 1,900 watts average 5,000 watts peak
- HAAT: 55.5 metres (182 ft)

Links
- Webcast: Listen Live
- Website: cinafm.com

CINA-FM (102.3 MHz) is a radio station broadcasting a mixture of English-language and ethnic/multilingual music and programming in Windsor, Ontario, Canada.

The station broadcasts with an antenna aimed toward the northwest and southeast, to protect nearby stations on the same frequency: CHST-FM in London; WGRT in Port Huron, Michigan; WPOS-FM in Toledo, Ohio and WFXN-FM in Galion, Ohio. In consequence, the coverage area reaches out to ethnic communities in both Windsor and Detroit, Michigan.

== History ==
In 2008, Neeti P. Ray, on behalf of a corporation to be incorporated, received approval in part from the Canadian Radio-television and Telecommunications Commission (CRTC) to operate a new ethnic FM radio station (CJNR-FM) to serve Windsor at 95.9 MHz. However, the 95.9 MHz frequency was awarded to Blackburn Radio's CJWF-FM which launched in November 2009.

In 2009, the Commission approved the application by the CBC to convert CBC Radio One outlet CBE from 1550 kHz to 97.5 MHz, making their plans to install a nested transmitter at 102.3 obsolete. As a result, the 102.3 MHz frequency became available by September 2011.

former CINA-FM logo

On December 13, 2011, Ray filed an application to allow CJNR-FM to operate at 102.3 MHz; this was approved on March 2, 2012.

The station launched on September 6, 2012, having changed its callsign to CINA-FM (after Mississauga/Toronto sister station CINA AM).

== Programming ==
CINA FM's airs programming in a variety of language including: Arabic, Assyrian, Cantonese, German, Hindi, Hungarian, Italian, Macedonian, Romanian, Serbian, Spanish and Ukrainian. 80% of the daily programming is in Arabic.
