= CBE-FM =

CBC Music station in Windsor, Ontario

- Windsor, Ontario; Canada
- Broadcast area: Essex County and Southeast Michigan
- Frequency: 89.9 MHz
- Branding: CBC Music

Programming
- Language: English
- Format: Adult contemporary/Public music

Ownership
- Owner: Canadian Broadcasting Corporation
- Sister stations: CBEW-FM, CBEF, CBET-DT

History
- First air date: March 4, 1979
- Call sign meaning: Canadian Broadcasting Corporation Essex County

Technical information
- Class: C1
- ERP: 71,750 watts average 72,580 watts peak
- HAAT: 164 metres (538 ft)
- Transmitter coordinates: 42°09′09″N 82°57′05″W

Links
- Website: CBC Windsor

CBE-FM is the call sign of the CBC Music station in Windsor, Ontario, Canada. The station broadcasts on 89.9 MHz.

The station was launched on March 4, 1979.
