= CBEW-FM =

CBC Radio One station in Windsor, Ontario

- Windsor, Ontario; Canada
- Broadcast area: Southwestern Ontario
- Frequency: 97.5 MHz

Programming
- Language: English
- Format: News/Talk
- Network: CBC Radio One

Ownership
- Owner: Canadian Broadcasting Corporation
- Sister stations: CBE-FM, CBEF, CBET-DT

History
- First air date: February 14, 1935 (as CRCW); July 1, 1950 (relaunch as CBE)
- Former call signs: CRCW (1935–1938); CBE (1950–2011)
- Former frequencies: 600 kHz (1935–1938); 1550 kHz (1950–2011)
- Call sign meaning: Canadian Broadcasting Corporation Essex County Windsor

Technical information
- Class: B
- ERP: 2,300 watts average; 13,800 watts peak
- HAAT: 427 feet (130 m)
- Transmitter coordinates: 42°09′12″N 82°57′11″W

Links
- Website: www.cbc.ca/windsor/

CBEW-FM (97.5 MHz) is the call sign of the CBC Radio One station based in and serving Windsor, Ontario, Canada. CBEW broadcasts from transmission facilities at McGregor and also reaches the nearby Detroit area and parts of Southwestern Ontario through relay transmitters in Chatham–Kent, Leamington, and Sarnia.

== History ==
The station first broadcast on February 14, 1935 as a CRBC station CRCW 600 AM, which broadcast until 1938 (changing its call sign to CBW in 1937 after the CRBC became the CBC). Between 1938 and 1950, CBC Radio programming was aired on private affiliate CKLW. A CBC-owned station was subsequently relaunched in 1950 using the CBE call sign and 1550 frequency. Regional FM rebroadcasters were added in 1977.

On May 9, 2008, the CRTC approved the station's application to launch a low-power nested FM rebroadcaster (CBE-1-FM) in Windsor, at 102.3 FM. Six months later, on November 13, 2008, the CBC applied to the CRTC to convert CBE from the AM band to the FM band on 97.5 MHz, to revoke its previous request for CBE-1, and to include a new FM rebroadcaster in Leamington on 91.9 MHz (which was originally planned for 91.5 MHz but was moved due to conflict with Windsor station CJAM-FM which, until October 2009, was also on 91.5). The new 97.5 main signal would broadcast with a directional antenna to the southeast, to avoid interference with two other stations on 97.5, London's CIQM-FM and Lansing, Michigan's WJIM-FM.

On June 16, 2009, CBE received approval for its conversion to FM and for its Leamington repeater. Originally, no time frame was given for the AM to FM transition, though after the new FM signal would sign on, the AM signal was to go silent after three months of simulcasting, with the repeater signal on 102.3 to close within thirty days of the start-up of the 97.5 signal. That decision came following the CRTC approval for CJAM to relocate to 99.1 in March 2009. The 97.5 facilities began testing on December 1, 2010, the start of a 7-month testing stage that also included resolving issues between the new signal and second-adjacent stations in Detroit (WXYT-FM 97.1 and WJLB 97.9). The station officially launched on July 1, 2011 under the call sign of CBEW-FM (which was the call sign for a defunct CBC radio transmitter in Fraserdale).

In accordance with the original transition plans, the CBC announced that CBE would close down on September 30, 2011. Sometime after midnight on October 1, 2011, without fanfare, CBE's 10,000-watt Class-A 1550 AM signal was either powered down or shutdown. According to Scott Fybush's Northeast Radio Watch, CBE 1550 AM's sign-off happened without fanfare; indeed, the scheduled midnight end to CBE was extended out for a bit as the station came back on and off the air several times before finally dropping audio at 12:25 a.m. October 1, leaving just a dead carrier on 1550 AM.

In May 2012, the CBC filed a request with the CRTC to move Windsor's Première Chaîne station CBEF to CBE's former frequency and transmitter, owing to potential issues with the age of the facilities and rust found on its tower in August 2011. The move was approved by the CRTC on October 16, 2012. The move would bring programming back to 1550 for the first time since CBE's sign-off.

== Local programming ==
CBEW produces the local morning program Windsor Morning, hosted by Amy Dodge.

Prior to 2015, the station produced the local afternoon program The Bridge, hosted by Bob Steele. In 2015 that program was renamed Afternoon Drive, expanded its focus to cover much of the Southwestern Ontario region, and was added to the schedule of the network's London station CBCL-FM; in 2017, the program's production was moved to London, concurrently with the launch of a new local morning program on that station. The program is now hosted by Matt Allen.

== Rebroadcasters ==
Rebroadcasters of CBEW-FM
City of licence	Identifier	Frequency	Power	Class	RECNet	CRTC Decision	Notes
Chatham-Kent	CBEE-FM	88.1 FM	1,430 watts	A	Query	86-192	42°26′57.12″N 82°4′59.88″W
Sarnia	CBEG-FM	90.3 FM	1,800 watts	A	Query	86-193	42°54′30.96″N 82°20′18.96″W
Leamington	CBEW-FM-1	91.9 FM	10,450 watts	B1	Query	2009-349	42°6′46.08″N 82°39′51.84″W

Former repeater, now shut down:

City of licence	Identifier	Frequency	Power	Class	RECNet	CRTC Decision
Windsor	CBE-1-FM	102.3 FM	690 watts	A	Query	2008-102

The 102.3 frequency is now used by CINA-FM, which signed on in September 2012.
